= Portraiture of Elizabeth I =

Portraits of Elizabeth I of England and Ireland

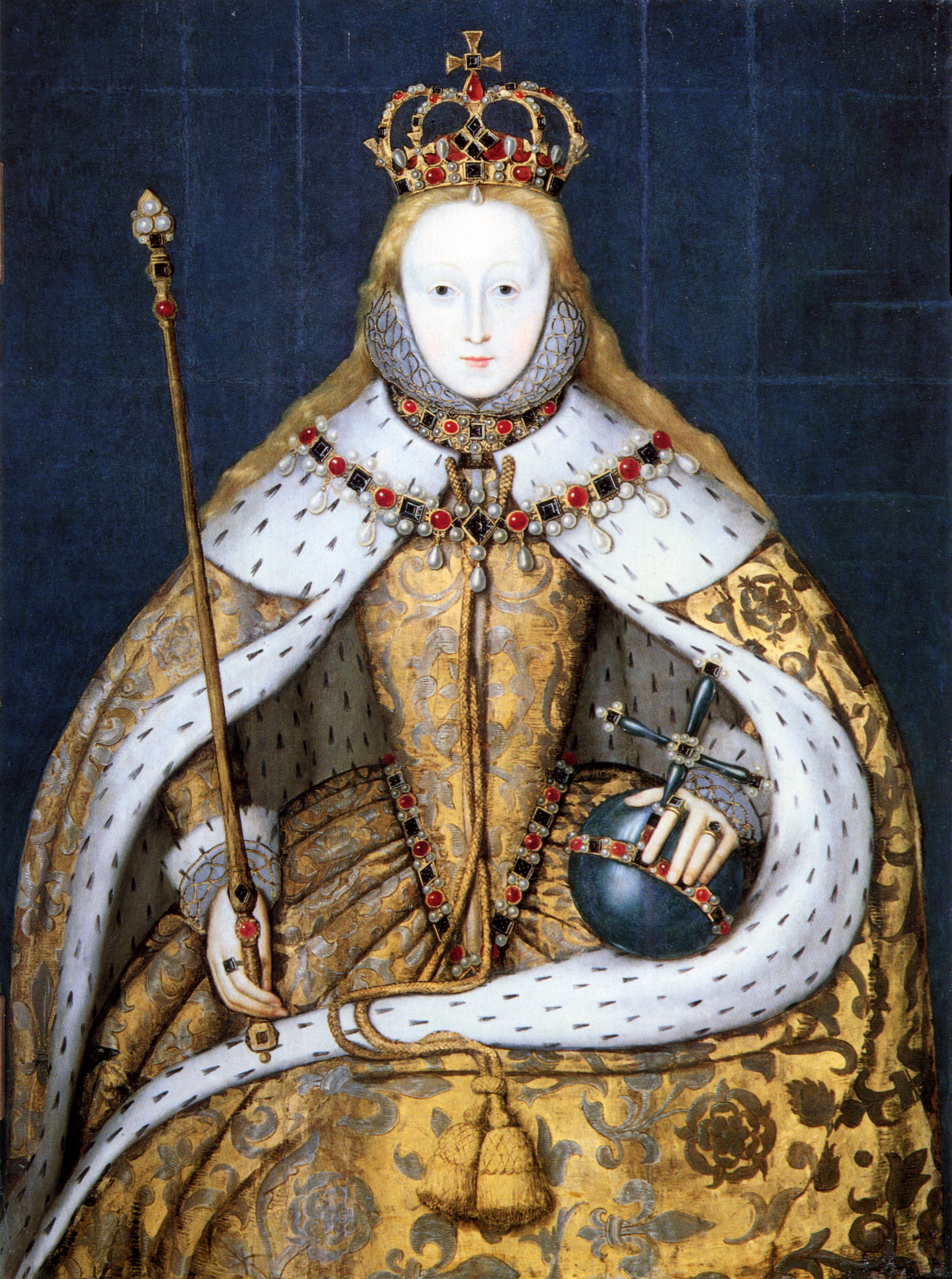
Portrait of Elizabeth I in her coronation robes. Copy c. 1600–1610 of a lost original of c. 1559. The pose echoes the famous portrait of Richard II in Westminster Abbey, the second known portrait of a British sovereign.

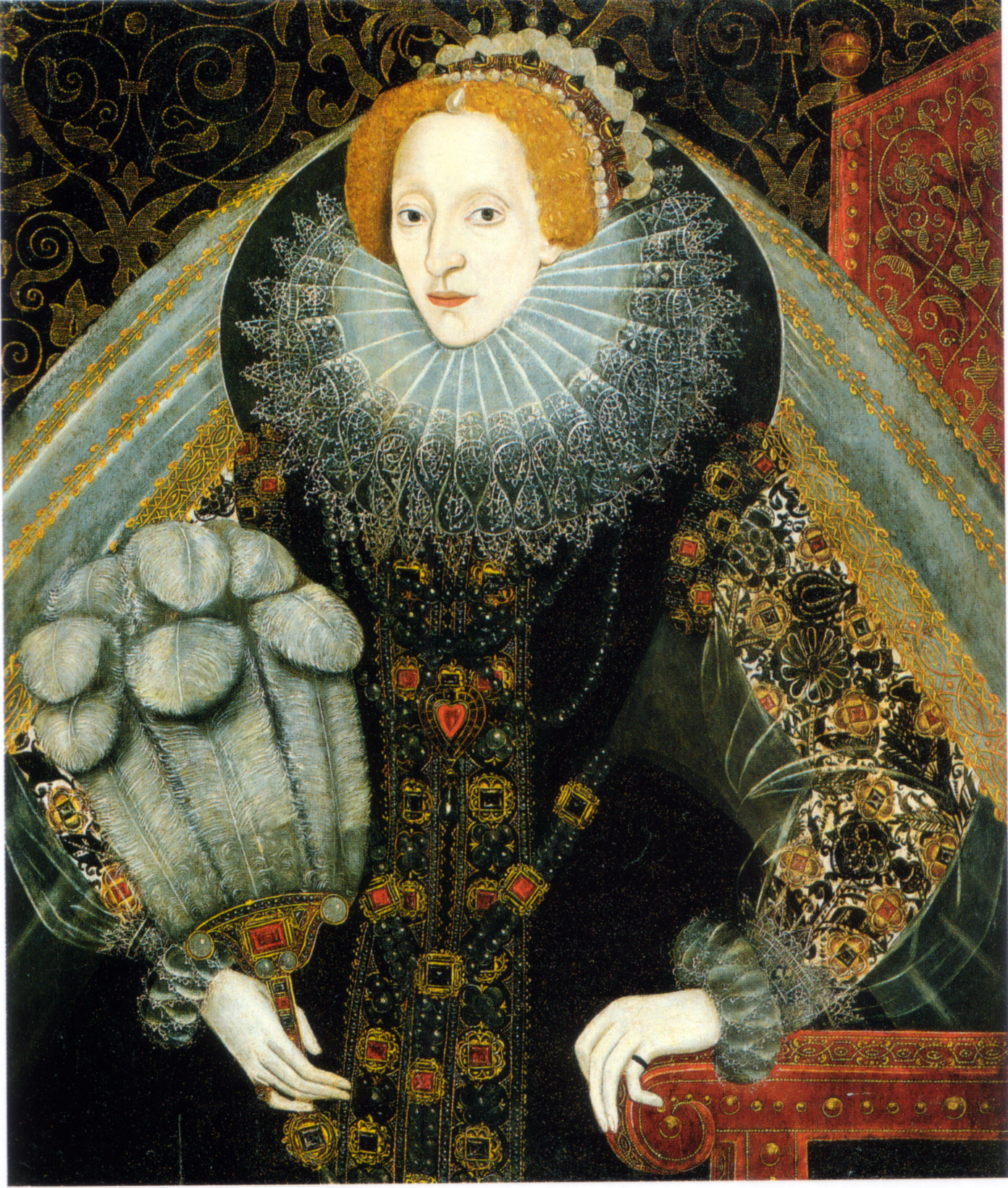
One of many portraits of its type, with a reversed Darnley face pattern, c. 1585–90, artist unknown

The portraiture of Queen Elizabeth I (1533–1603) spans the evolution of English royal portraits in the early modern period (1400/1500–1800), from the earliest representations of simple likenesses to the later complex imagery used to convey the power and aspirations of the state, as well as of the monarch at its head.

Even the earliest portraits of Elizabeth I contain symbolic objects such as roses and prayer books that would have carried meaning to viewers of her day. Later portraits of Elizabeth layer the iconography of empire—globes, crowns, swords and columns—and representations of virginity and purity, such as moons and pearls, with classical allusions, to present a complex "story" that conveyed to Elizabethan era viewers the majesty and significance of the 'Virgin Queen'.

== Overview ==
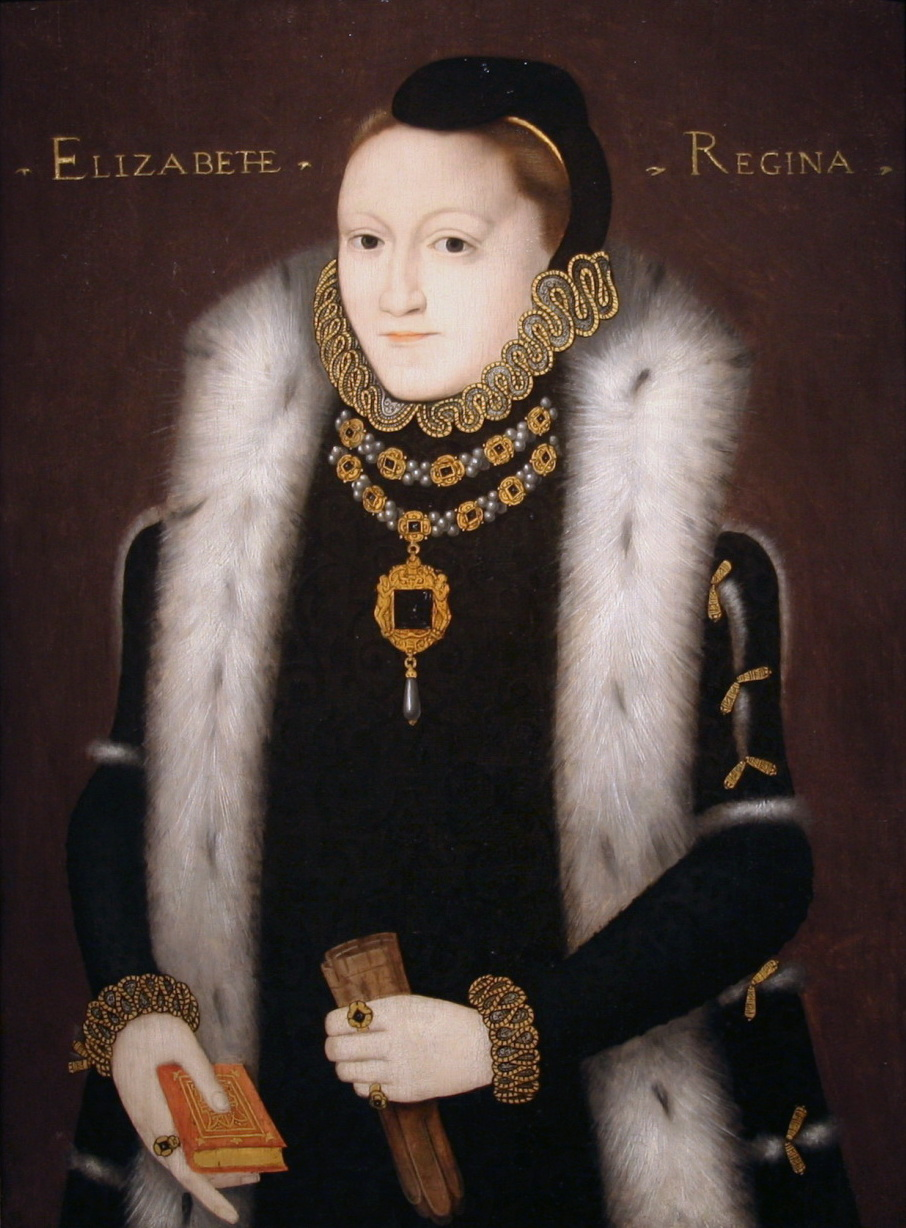
Elizabeth "in blacke with a hoode and cornet", the Clopton Portrait, c. 1558–60

=== Portraiture in Tudor England ===
Two portraiture traditions had arisen in the Tudor court since the days of Elizabeth's father, Henry VIII. The portrait miniature developed from the illuminated manuscript tradition. These small personal images were almost invariably painted from life over the space of a few days in watercolours on vellum, stiffened by being glued to a playing card. Panel paintings in oils on prepared wood surfaces were based on preparatory drawings and were usually executed at life size, as were oil paintings on canvas.

Unlike her contemporaries in France, Elizabeth never granted rights to produce her portrait to a single artist, although Nicholas Hilliard was appointed her official limner, or miniaturist and goldsmith. George Gower, a fashionable court portraitist created Serjeant Painter in 1581, was responsible for approving all portraits of the Queen created by other artists from 1581 until his death in 1596.

Elizabeth sat for a number of artists over the years, including Hilliard, Cornelis Ketel, Federico Zuccari, Isaac Oliver, and most likely to Gower and Marcus Gheeraerts the Younger. Portraits were commissioned by the government as gifts to foreign monarchs and to show to prospective suitors. Courtiers commissioned heavily symbolic paintings to demonstrate their devotion to the Queen, and the fashionable long galleries of later Elizabethan country houses were filled with sets of portraits. The studios of Tudor artists produced images of Elizabeth working from approved "face patterns", or approved drawings of the Queen, to meet this growing demand for her image, an important symbol of loyalty and reverence for the crown in times of turbulence.

=== European context ===
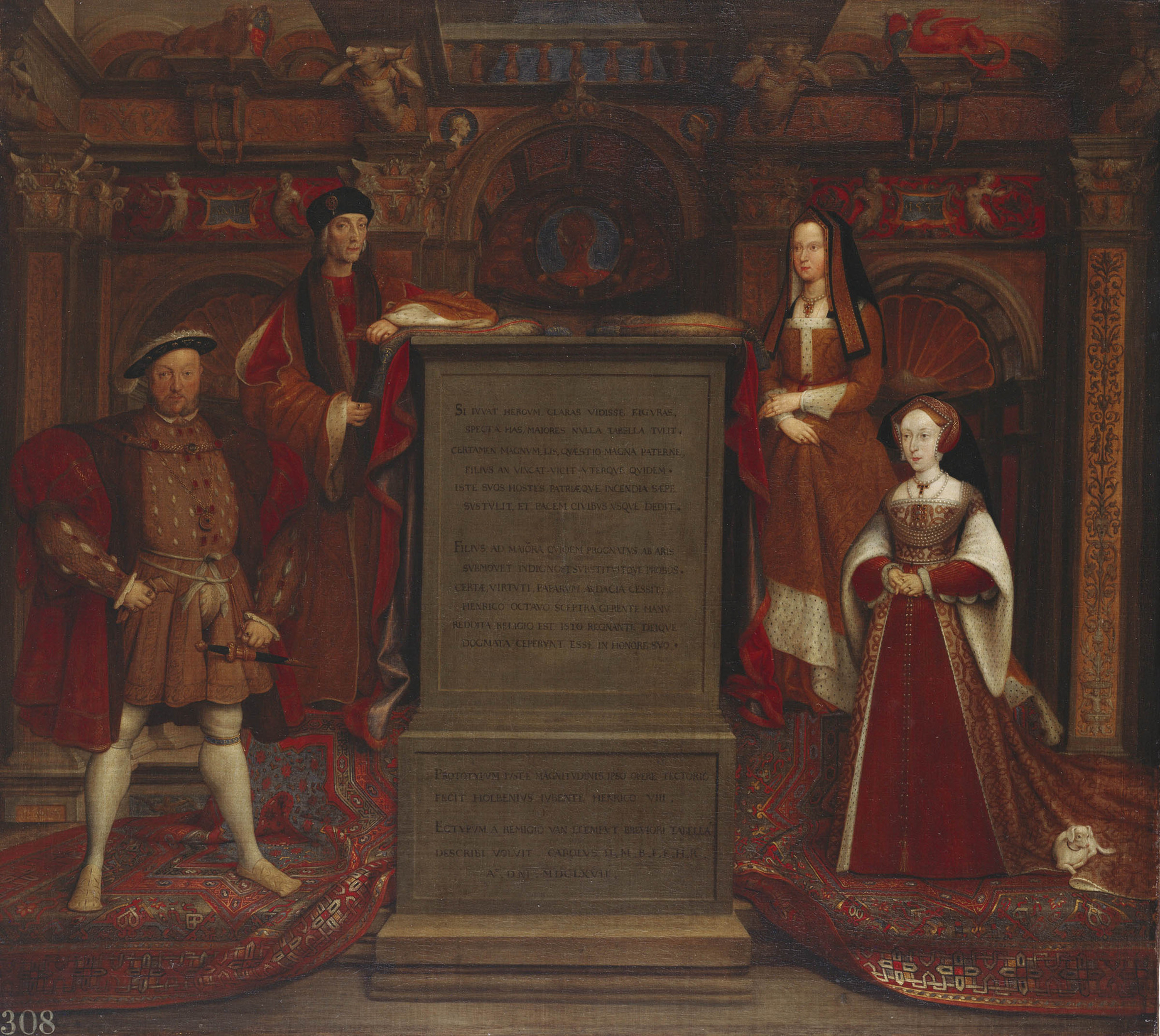
A copy of Holbein's Whitehall Mural.

By far the most impressive models of portraiture available to English portraitists were the many portraits by Hans Holbein the Younger, the outstanding Northern portraitist of the first half of the 16th century, who had made two lengthy visits to England, and had been Henry VIII's court artist. Holbein had accustomed the English court to the full-length life-size portrait, (Note: This was in notable contrast to France, in particular, where smaller portraits remained more typical until Henry IV of France came to power in 1594.) although none of his originals now survive. His great dynastic mural at Whitehall Palace, destroyed by fire in 1698, and perhaps other original large portraits, would have been familiar to Elizabethan artists. (Note: Waterhouse (19–22) points out that only very high ranking persons could enter the room where the mural was displayed when the court was in residence at Whitehall. But artists could probably have gained access during the long periods when the monarch was elsewhere; certainly there are many apparent copies of the figure of Henry from this work.)

Both Holbein and his great Italian contemporary Titian had combined great psychological penetration with a sufficiently majestic impression to satisfy their royal patrons. By his second visit, Holbein had already begun to move away from a strictly realist depiction; in his Jane Seymour, "the figure is no longer seen as displacing with its bulk a recognizable section of space: it approaches rather to a flat pattern, made alive by a bounding and vital outline". This tendency was to be taken much further by the later portraits of Elizabeth, where "Likeness of feature and an interest in form and volume have gradually been abandoned in favour of an effect of splendid majesty obtained by decorative pattern, and the forms have been flattened accordingly".

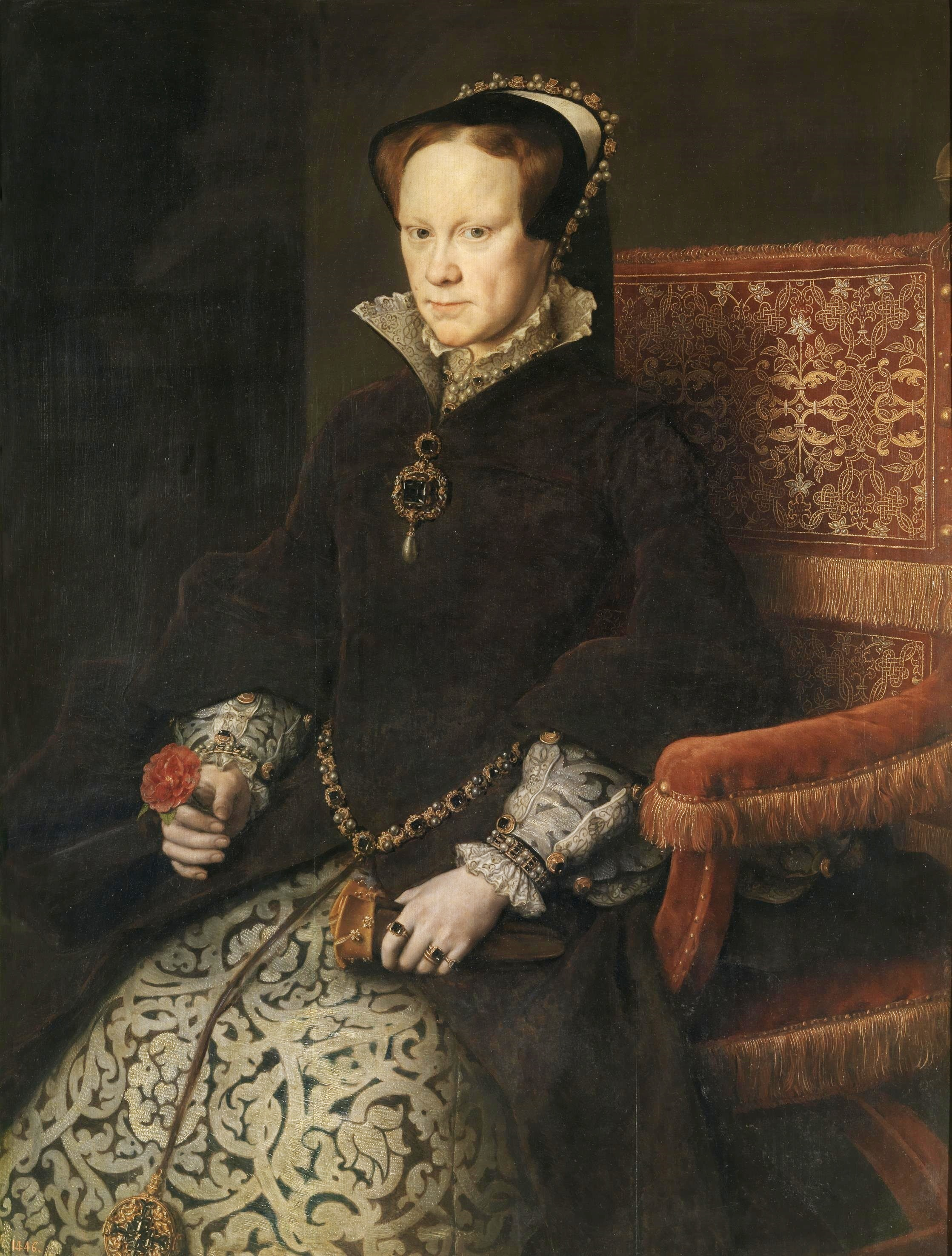
Mary I, Anthonis Mor, 1554

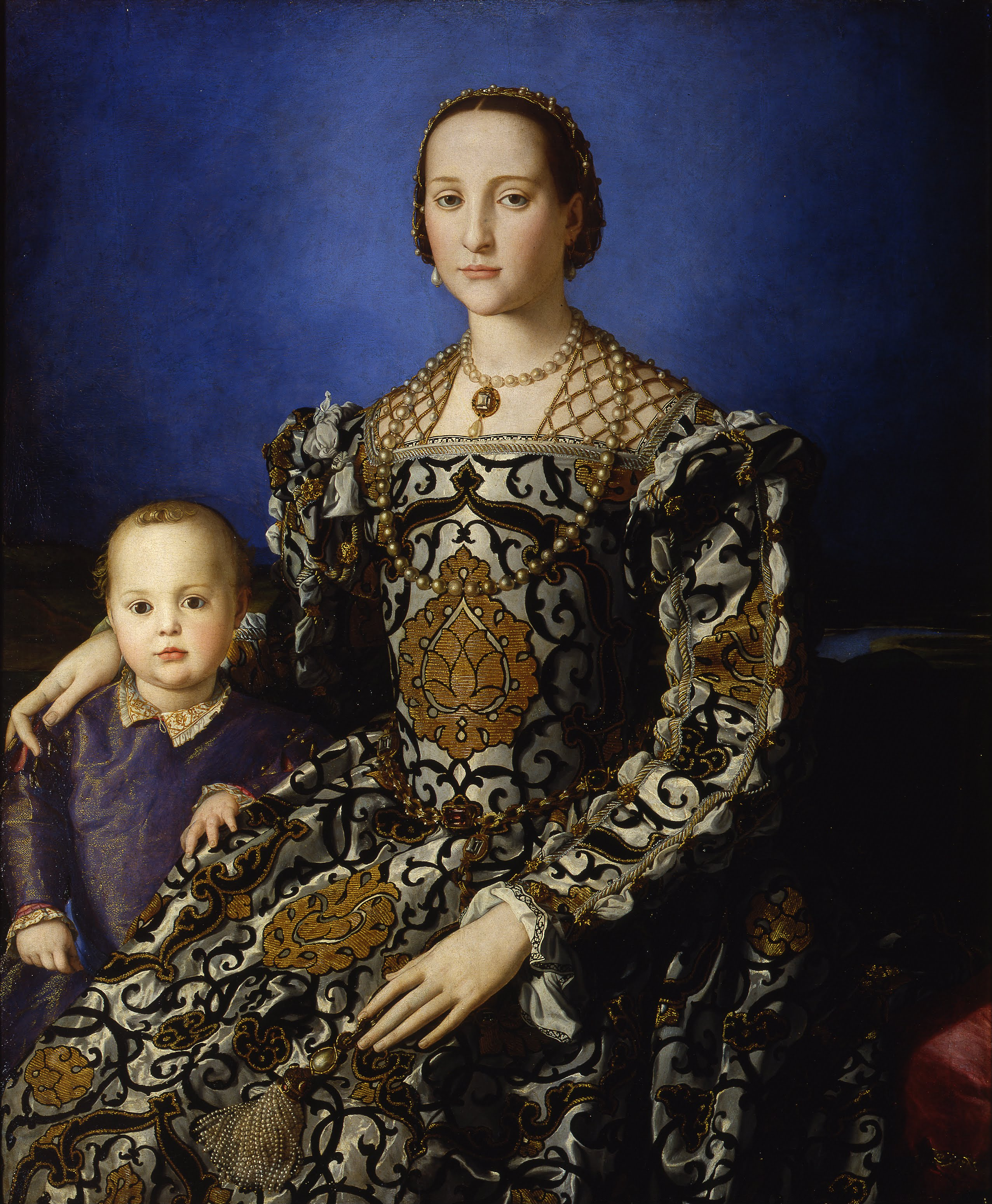
Eleanor of Toledo and her son Giovanni, Bronzino, 1545

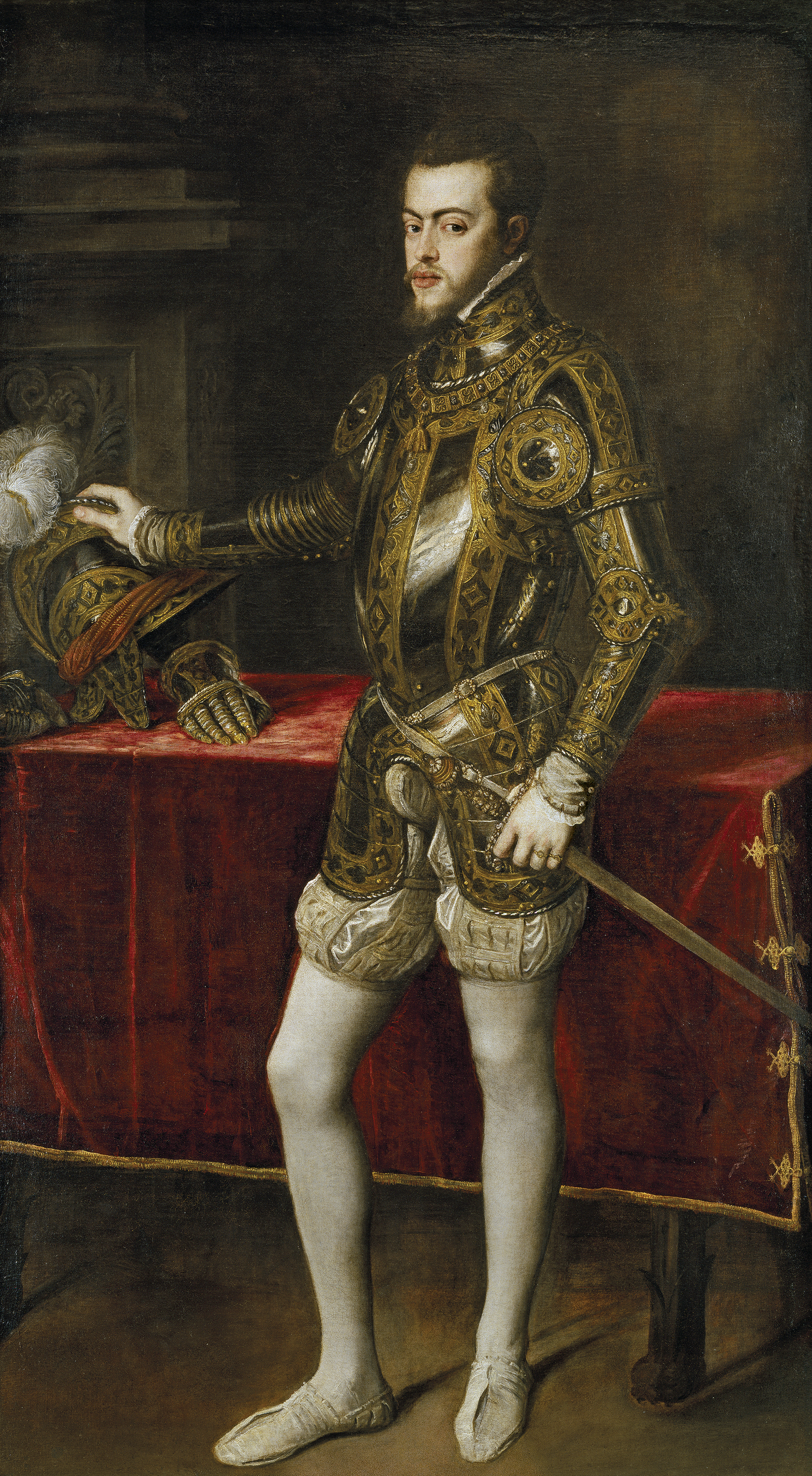
Titian's full-length portrait of Philip II

Titian continued to paint royal portraits, especially of Philip II of Spain, until the 1570s, but in sharply reduced numbers after about 1555, and he refused to travel from Venice to do them. The full-length portrait of Philip (1550–51) now in the Prado was sent to Elizabeth's elder sister and predecessor Mary I in advance of their marriage. (Note: The portrait came from Philip's aunt Mary in Brussels, presumably as a loan. It was presumably returned by or after Mary I's death in 1558, as it is in a Spanish royal inventory of 1600. The painting returned to London for an exhibition at the National Gallery until January 2009.)

Towards the mid-16th century, the most influential Continental courts came to prefer less revealing and intimate works, and at the mid-century the two most prominent and influential royal portraitists in paint, other than Titian, were the Netherlandish Anthonis Mor and Agnolo Bronzino in Florence, besides whom the Habsburg court sculptor and medallist Leone Leoni was similarly skilled. Mor, who had risen rapidly to prominence in 1540s, worked across Europe for the Habsburgs in a tighter and more rigid version of Titian's compositional manner, drawing also on the North Italian style of Moretto da Brescia. Mor had actually visited London in 1554, and painted three versions of his well-known portrait of Queen Mary; he also painted English courtiers who visited Antwerp. (Note: Surviving portraits include those of Sir Thomas Gresham and Sir Henry Lee, who was later to commission the Ditchley Portrait.)

Mor's Spanish pupil Alonso Sánchez Coello continued in a stiffer version of his master's style, replacing him as Spanish court painter in 1561. Sofonisba Anguissola had painted in an intimately informal style, but after her recruitment to the Spanish court as the Queen's painter in 1560 was able to adapt her style to the much more formal demands of state portraiture. Moretto's pupil Giovanni Battista Moroni was Mor's contemporary and formed his mature style in the 1550s, but few of his spirited portraits were of royalty, or yet to be seen outside Italy. (Note: Even in Italy, his best portraits were routinely attributed to Titian or Moretto; for example, what has always been his (Giovanni Battista Moroni) most famous work, the so-called Titian's Schoolmaster, now resides in Washington, but was previously displayed in the Palazzo Borghese in Rome.)

Bronzino developed a style of coldly distant magnificence, based on the Mannerist portraits of Pontormo, working almost entirely for Cosimo I, the first Medici grand duke. (Note: In an extended discussion, Michael Levey says Bronzino showed the ducal family "so wrought and congealed that there is nothing of living tissue left in them. Their hands have turned to ivory, and their eyes to pieces of beautifully cut, faceted jet.") Bronzino's works, including his striking portraits of Cosimo's Duchess, Eleanor of Toledo, were distributed in many versions across Europe, continuing to be made for two decades from the same studio pattern; a new portrait painted in her last years, about 1560, exists in only a few repetitions. At the least many of the foreign painters in London are likely to have seen versions of the earlier type, and there may well have been one in the Royal Collection.

French portraiture remained dominated by small but finely drawn bust-length or half-length works, including many drawings, often with colour, by François Clouet following, with a host of imitators, his father Jean, or even smaller oils by the Netherlandish Corneille de Lyon and his followers, typically no taller than a paperback book. A few full-length portraits of royalty were produced, dependent on German or Italian models.

=== Creating the royal image ===
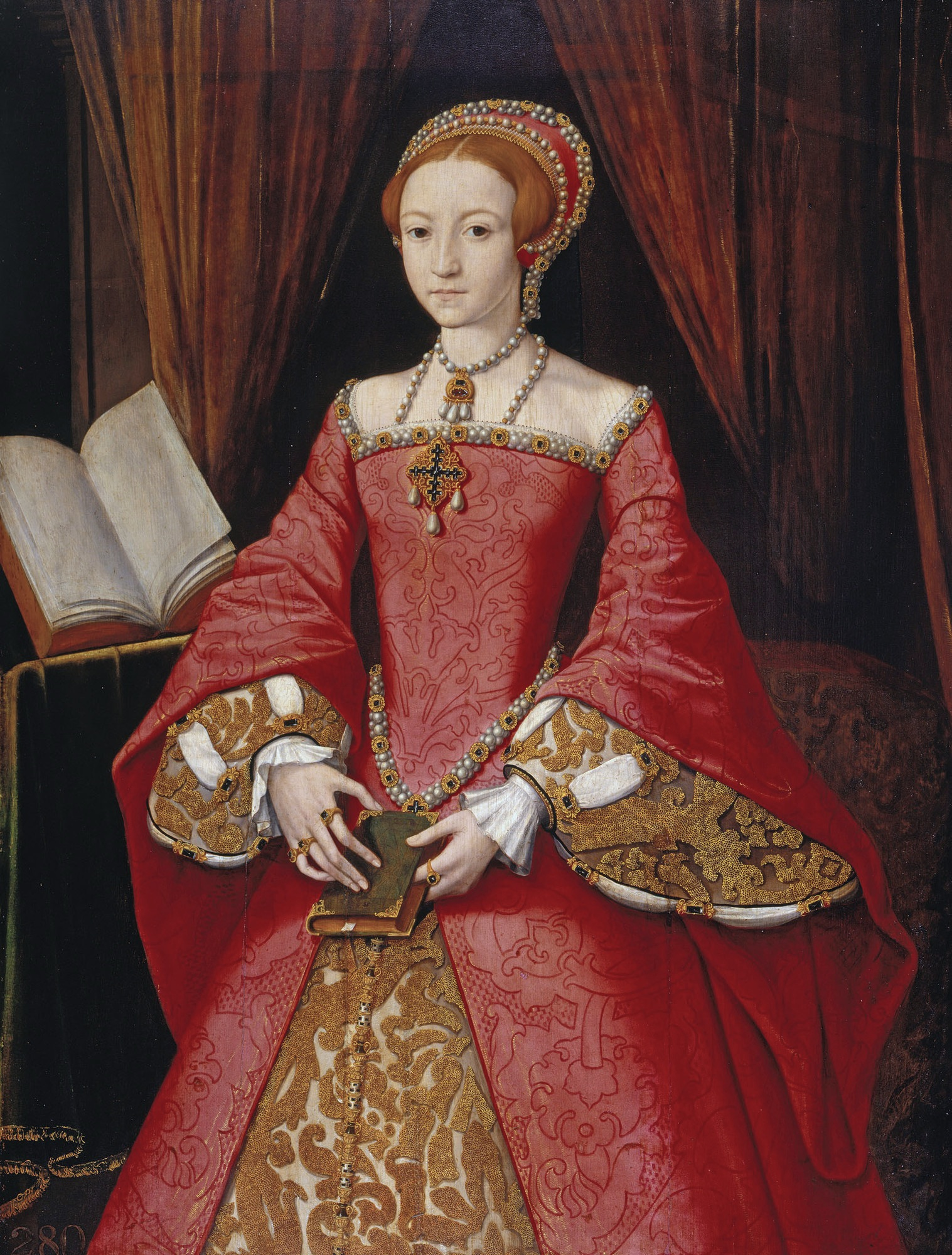
The Lady Elizabeth Tudor, c. 1546, by an unknown artist

William Gaunt contrasts the simplicity of the 1546 portrait of Lady Elizabeth Tudor with later images of her as queen. He wrote, "The painter...is unknown, but in a competently Flemish style he depicts the daughter of Anne Boleyn as quiet and studious-looking, ornament in her attire as secondary to the plainness of line that emphasizes her youth. Great is the contrast with the awesome fantasy of the later portraits: the pallid, mask-like features, the extravagance of headdress and ruff, the padded ornateness that seemed to exclude all humanity."

The lack of emphasis given to depicting depth and volume in her later portraits may have been influenced by the Queen's own views. In the Art of Limming, Hilliard cautioned against all but the minimal use of chiaroscuro modelling seen in his works, reflecting the views of his patron: "seeing that best to show oneself needeth no shadow of place but rather the open light...Her Majesty..chose her place to sit for that purpose in the open alley of a goodly garden, where no tree was near, nor any shadow at all..."

From the 1570s, the government sought to manipulate the image of the Queen as an object of devotion and veneration. Sir Roy Strong writes: "The cult of Gloriana was skilfully created to buttress public order and, even more, deliberately to replace the pre-Reformation externals of religion, the cult of the Virgin and saints with their attendant images, processions, ceremonies and secular rejoicing." The pageantry of the Accession Day tilts, the poetry of the court, and the most iconic of Elizabeth's portraits all reflected this effort. The management of the Queen's image reached its heights in the last decade of her reign, when realistic images of the aging Queen were replaced with an eternally youthful vision, defying the reality of the passage of time.

== Early portraits ==
=== The young queen ===
Portraits of the young Queen, many of them likely painted to be shown to prospective suitors and foreign heads of state, show a naturality and restraint similar to that of the portrait of the young Lady Elizabeth.

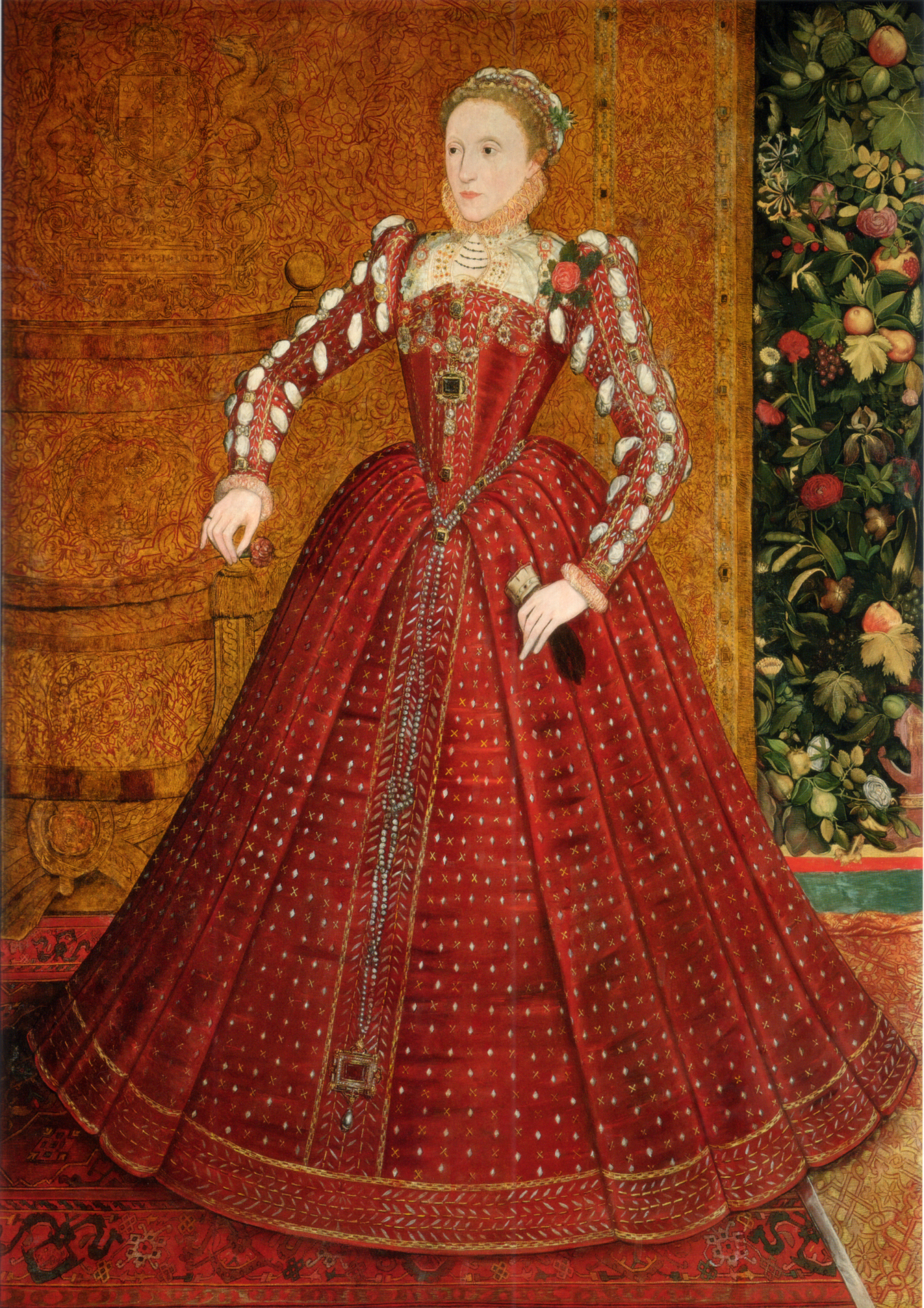
The Hampden Portrait of Elizabeth I, 1560s

The full-length Hampden image of Elizabeth in a red satin gown, originally attributed to Steven van der Meulen and reattributed to George Gower in 2020, has been identified by Sir Roy Strong as an important early portrait, "undertaken at a time when her image was being tightly controlled", and produced "in response to a crisis over the production of the royal image, one which was reflected in the words of a draft proclamation dated 1563". The draft proclamation (never published) was a response to the circulation of poorly made portraits in which Elizabeth was shown "in blacke with a hoode and cornet", a style she no longer wore. (Note: In these portraits Elizabeth may be wearing mourning for her sister Mary; see commentary on a portrait (Image) of Mary, Queen of Scots in a similar black gown and French hood with the cornet or bongrace pinned up at "Mary Queen of Scots (1542 - 1587) c. 1558". Historical Portraits Image Library. Archived from the original on 16 October 2008., where the costume is compared to Elizabeth's in the Clopton portrait type.) Symbolism in these pictures is in keeping with earlier Tudor portraiture; in some, Elizabeth holds a book (possibly a prayer book) suggesting studiousness or piety. In other paintings, she holds or wears a red rose, symbol of the Tudor Dynasty's descent from the House of Lancaster, or white roses, symbols of the House of York and of maidenly chastity. In the Hampden portrait, Elizabeth wears a red rose on her shoulder and holds a gillyflower in her hand. Of this image, Strong says "Here Elizabeth is caught in that short-lived period before what was a recognisable human became transmuted into a goddess". (Note: This portrait was sold at Sotheby's, London, for £2.6 million in November 2007.)

One artist active in Elizabeth's early court was the Flemish miniaturist Levina Teerlinc, who had served as a painter and gentlewoman to Mary I and stayed on as a Gentlewoman of the Privy Chamber to Elizabeth. Teerlinc is best known for her pivotal position in the rise of the portrait miniature. There is documentation that she created numerous portraits of Elizabeth I, both individual portraits and portraits of the sovereign with important court figures, but only a few of these have survived and been identified.

=== Elizabeth and the goddesses ===
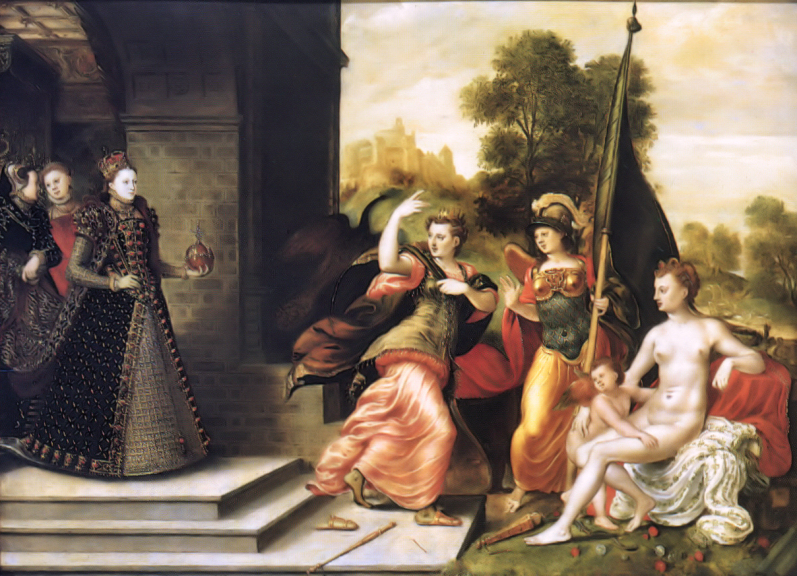
Elizabeth I and the Three Goddesses, 1569

Two surviving allegorical paintings show the early use of classical mythology to illustrate the beauty and sovereignty of the young queen. In Elizabeth I and the Three Goddesses (1569), attributed to Hans Eworth, (Note: The portrait is signed "H.E." and the artist formerly identified as the "Monogrammist H.E." is now generally assumed to be Hans Eworth. Strong had earlier attributed the painting to Joris Hoefnagel.) the story of the Judgement of Paris is turned on its head. Elizabeth, rather than Paris, is now sent to choose among Juno, Venus, and Pallas-Minerva, all of whom are outshone by the Queen with her crown and royal orb. As Susan Doran writes, "Implicit to the theme of the painting ... is the idea that Elizabeth's retention of royal power benefits her realm. Whereas Paris's judgement in the original myth resulted in the long Trojan Wars 'to the utter ruin of the Trojans', hers will conversely bring peace and order to the state" after the turbulent reign of Elizabeth's sister Mary I.

The latter theme lies behind the 1572 The Family of Henry VIII: An Allegory of the Tudor Succession (attributed to Lucas de Heere). In this image, Catholic Mary and her husband Philip II of Spain are accompanied by Mars, the god of War, on the left, while Protestant Elizabeth on the right ushers in the goddesses Peace and Plenty. An inscription states that this painting was a gift from the Queen to Francis Walsingham as a "Mark of her people's and her own content", and this may indicate that the painting commemorates the signing of the Treaty of Blois (1572), which established an alliance between England and France against Spanish aggression in the Netherlands during Walsingham's tour of duty as ambassador to the French court. Strong identifies both paintings as celebrations of Elizabeth's just rule by Flemish exiles, to whom England was a refuge from the religious persecution of Protestants in the Spanish Netherlands.

=== Hilliard and the queen ===
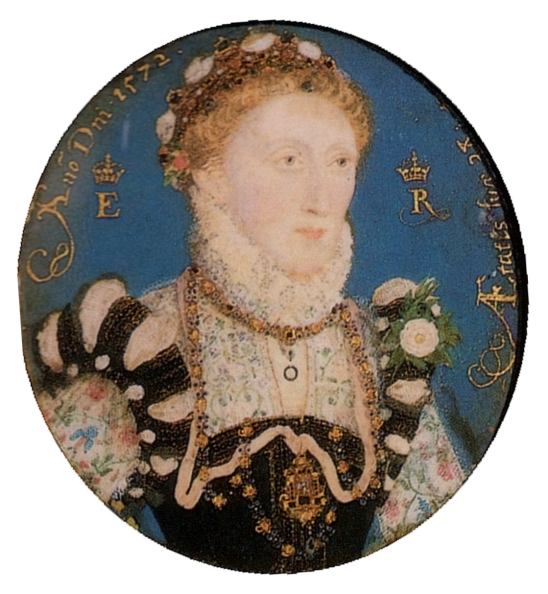
Miniature by Hilliard, 1572

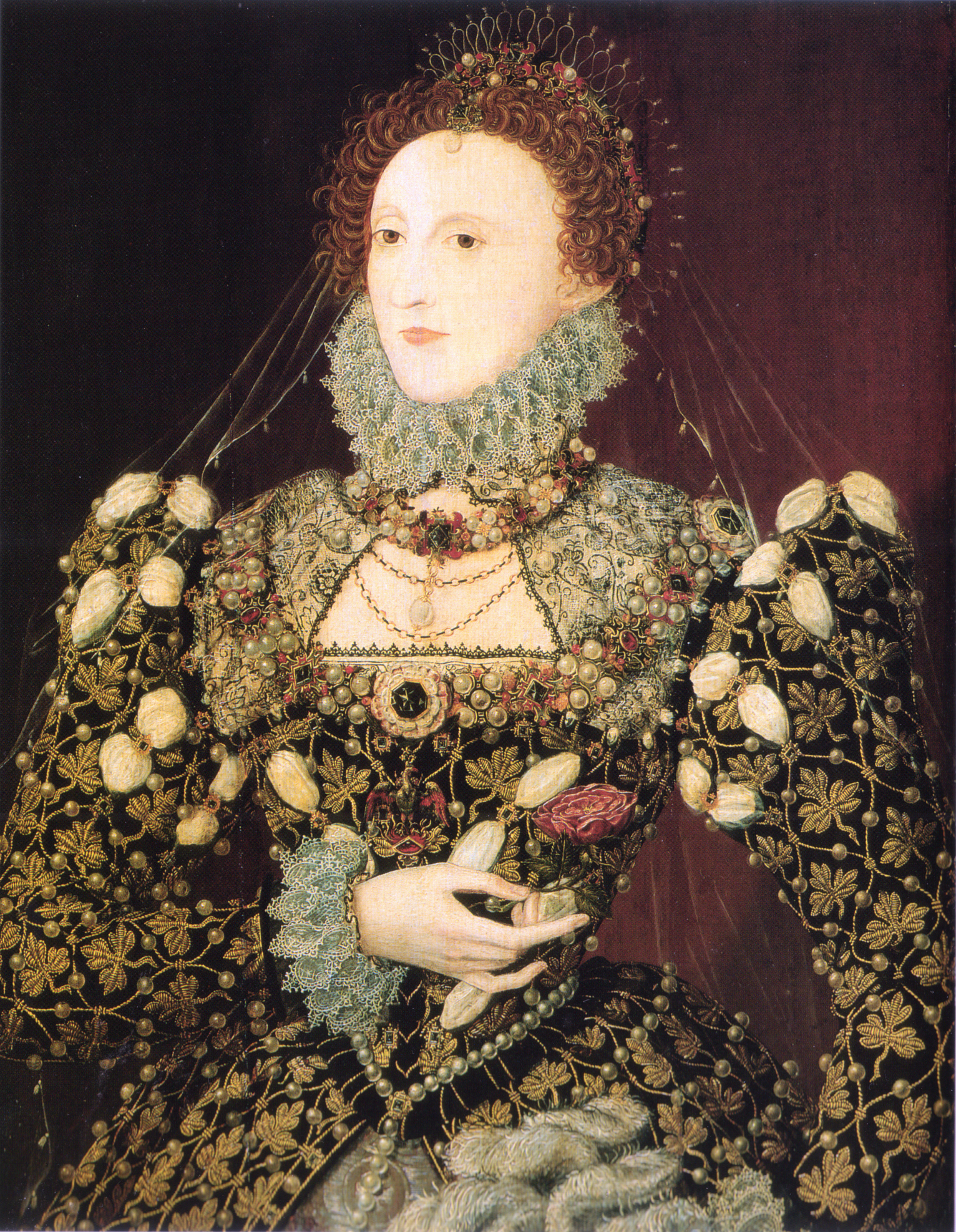
The Phoenix Portrait, c. 1575, attributed to Hilliard

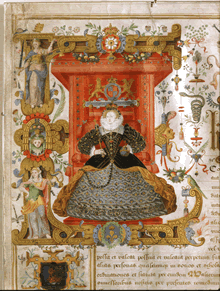
Emmanuel College charter, 1584

Nicholas Hilliard was an apprentice to the Queen's jeweller Robert Brandon, a goldsmith and city chamberlain of London, and Strong suggests that Hilliard may also have been trained in the art of limning by Levina Teerlinc. Hilliard emerged from his apprenticeship at a time when a new royal portrait painter was "desperately needed."

Hilliard's first known miniature of the Queen is dated 1572. It is not known when he was formally appointed limner (miniaturist) and goldsmith to Elizabeth, though he was granted the reversion of a lease by the Queen in 1573 for his "good, true and loyal service." Two panel portraits long attributed to him, the Phoenix and Pelican portraits, are dated c. 1572–76. These paintings are named after the jewels the queen wears, her personal badges of the pelican in her piety and the phoenix. National Portrait Gallery researchers announced in September 2010 that the two portraits were painted on wood from the same two trees; they also found that a tracing of the Phoenix portrait matches the Pelican portrait in reverse, deducing that both pictures of Elizabeth in her forties were painted around the same time.

However, Hilliard's panel portraits seem to have been found wanting at the time, and in 1576 the recently married Hilliard left for France to improve his skills. Returning to England, he continued to work as a goldsmith, and produced some spectacular "picture boxes" or jewelled lockets for miniatures: the Armada Jewel, given by Elizabeth to Sir Thomas Heneage and the Drake Pendant given to Sir Francis Drake are the best known examples. As part of the cult of the Virgin Queen, courtiers were expected to wear the Queen's likeness, at least at Court.

Hilliard's appointment as miniaturist to the Crown included the old sense of a painter of illuminated manuscripts and he was commissioned to decorate important documents, such as the founding charter of Emmanuel College, Cambridge (1584), which has an enthroned Elizabeth under a canopy of estate within an elaborate framework of Flemish-style Renaissance strapwork and grotesque ornament. He also seems to have designed woodcut title-page frames and borders for books, some of which bear his initials.

=== The Darnley Portrait ===
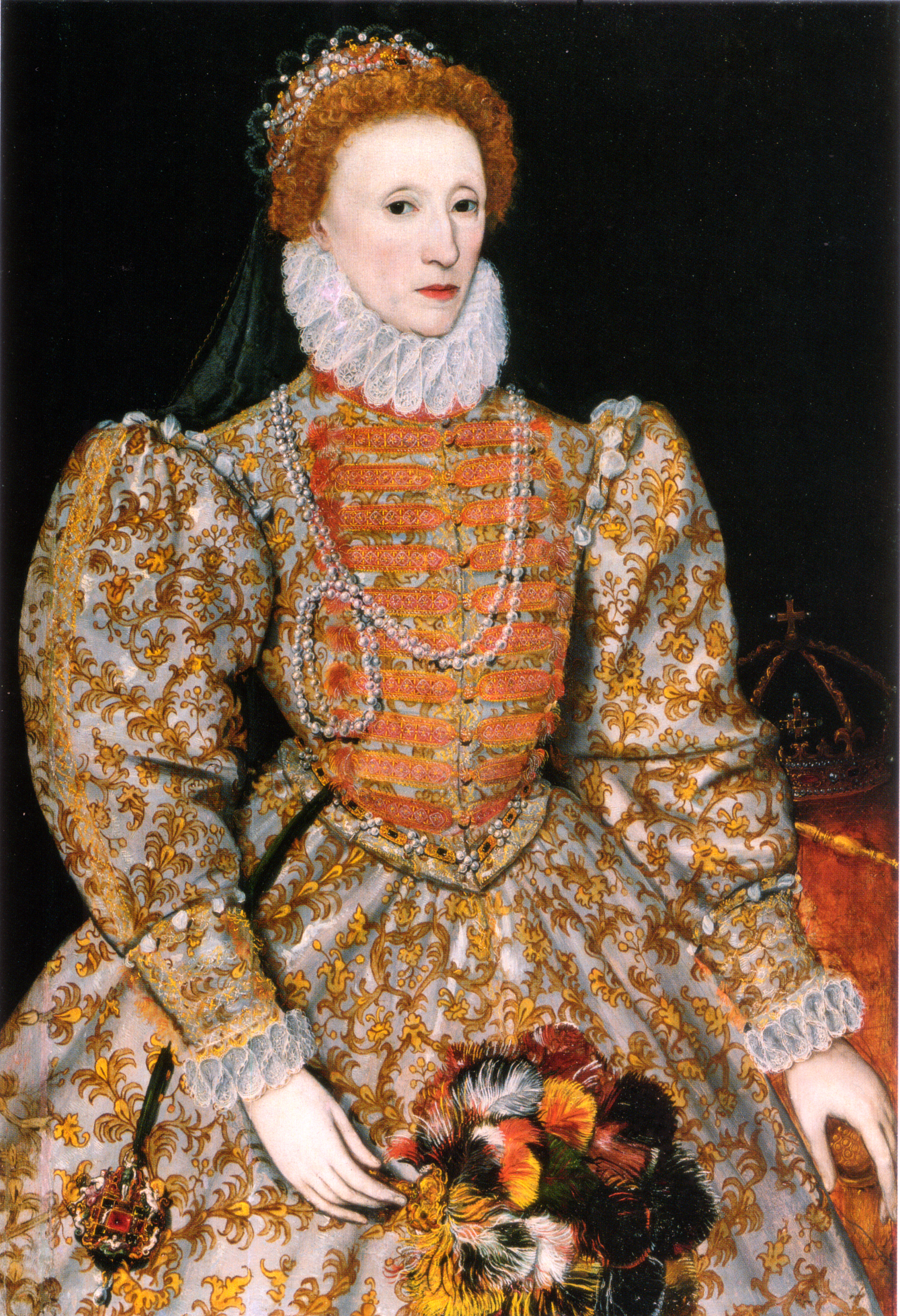
The Darnley Portrait, c. 1575

The problem of an official portrait of Elizabeth was solved with the Darnley Portrait. (Note: So-called from its location at Cobham Hall, much later the seat of the Earls of Darnley.) Likely painted from life around 1575–6, this portrait is the source of a face pattern which would be used and reused for authorized portraits of Elizabeth into the 1590s, preserving the impression of ageless beauty. Strong suggests that the artist is Federico Zuccari or Zuccaro, an "eminent" Italian artist, though not a specialist portraitist, who is known to have visited the court briefly with a letter of introduction to Elizabeth's favourite Robert Dudley, 1st Earl of Leicester, dated 5 March 1575. Zuccari's preparatory drawings for full-length portraits of both Leicester and Elizabeth survive, although it is unlikely the full-length of Elizabeth was ever painted. Curators at the National Portrait Gallery believe that the attribution of the Darnley portrait to Zuccari is "not sustainable", and attribute the work to an unknown "continental" (possibly Dutch) artist.

The Darnley Portrait features a crown and sceptre on a table beside the queen, and was the first appearance of these symbols of sovereignty separately used as props (rather than worn and carried) in Tudor portraiture, a theme that would be expanded in later portraits. Recent conservation work has revealed that Elizabeth's now-iconic pale complexion in this portrait is the result of deterioration of red lake pigments, which has also altered the coloring of her dress.

== The Virgin Empress of the Seas ==
=== Return of the Golden Age ===
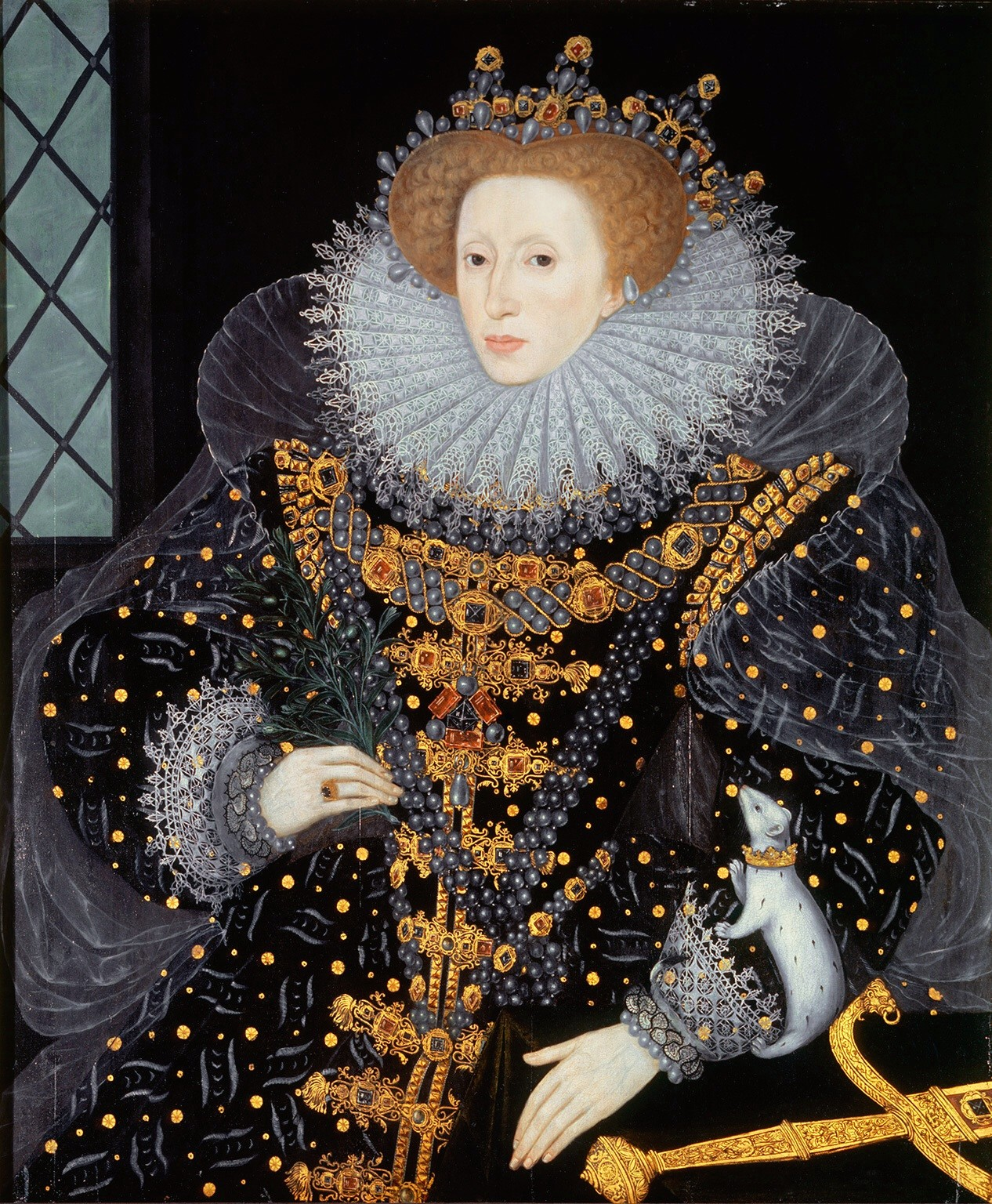
The Ermine Portrait, variously attributed to William Segar or George Gower, 1585. Elizabeth as Pax (lit., "peace").

The excommunication of Elizabeth by Pope Pius V in 1570 led to increased tension with Philip II of Spain, who championed the Catholic Mary, Queen of Scots, as the legitimate heir of his late wife Mary I. This tension played out over the next decades in the seas of the New World as well as in Europe, and culminated in the invasion attempt of the Spanish Armada.

It is against this backdrop that the first of a long series of portraits appears, depicting Elizabeth with heavy symbolic overlays of the possession of an empire based on mastery of the seas. Combined with a second layer of symbolism representing Elizabeth as the Virgin Queen, these new paintings signify the manipulation of Elizabeth's image as the destined Protestant protector of her people.

Strong points out that there is no trace of this iconography in portraits of Elizabeth prior to 1579, and identifies its source as the conscious image-making of John Dee, whose 1577 General and Rare Memorials Pertayning to the Perfect Arte of Navigation encouraged the establishment of English colonies in the New World supported by a strong navy, asserting Elizabeth's claims to an empire via her supposed descent from Brutus of Troy and King Arthur.

Dee's inspiration lies in Geoffrey of Monmouth's History of the Kings of Britain, which was accepted as true history by Elizabethan poets, and formed the basis of the symbolic history of England. In this 12th-century pseudohistory, Britain was founded by and named after Brutus, the descendant of Aeneas, who founded Rome. The Tudors, of Welsh descent, were heirs of the most ancient Britons and thus of Aeneas and Brutus. By uniting the Houses of York and Lancaster following the strife of the Wars of the Roses, the Tudors ushered in a united realm where Pax - Latin for "peace", and the Roman goddess of peace - reigned. The Spenserian scholar Edwin Greenlaw states, "The descent of the Britons from the Trojans, the linking of Arthur, Henry VIII, and Elizabeth as Britain's greatest monarchs, and the return under Elizabeth of the Golden Age are all commonplaces of Elizabethan thought." This understanding of history and Elizabeth's place in it forms the background to the symbolic portraits of the latter half of her reign.

=== The Virgin Queen ===
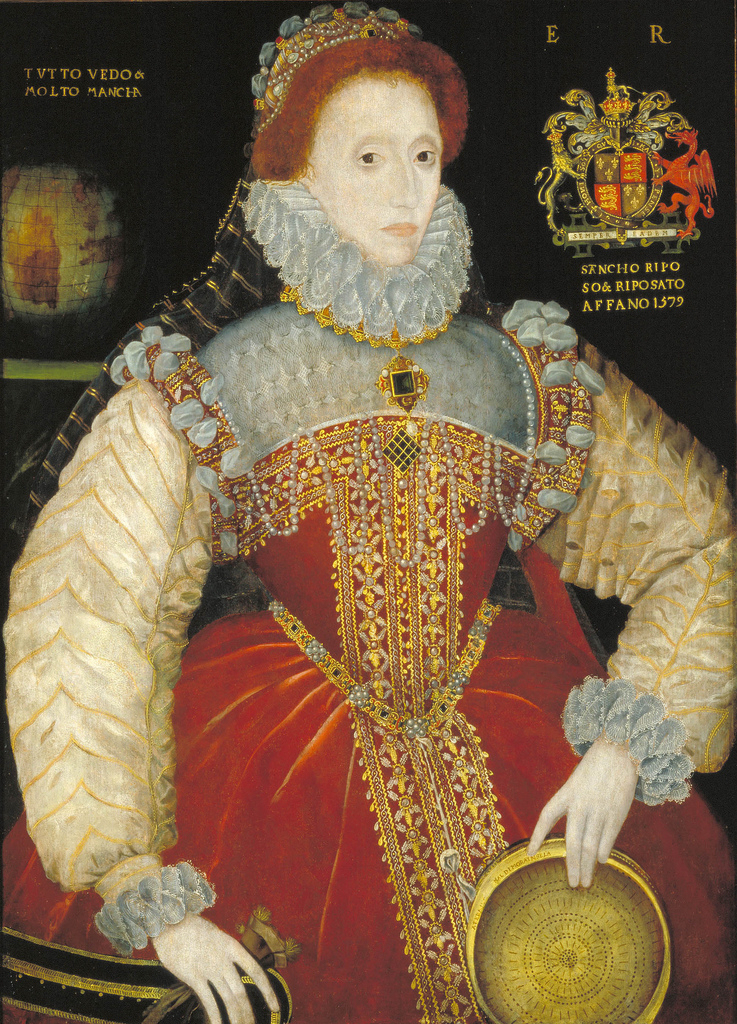
The Plimpton Sieve Portrait by George Gower, 1579

A series of Sieve Portraits copied the Darnley face pattern, and added an allegorical overlay that depicted Elizabeth as Tuccia, a Vestal Virgin who proved her chastity by carrying a sieve full of water from the Tiber River to the Temple of Vesta without spilling a drop. The first Sieve Portrait was painted by George Gower in 1579, but the most influential image is the 1583 version by Quentin Metsys the Younger. (Note: Although Strong attributed the painting to Cornelis Ketel in 1969 and again in 1987, closer examination has revealed that the painting is signed and dated on the base of the globe 1583. Q. MASSYS | ANT (for "of Antwerp").)

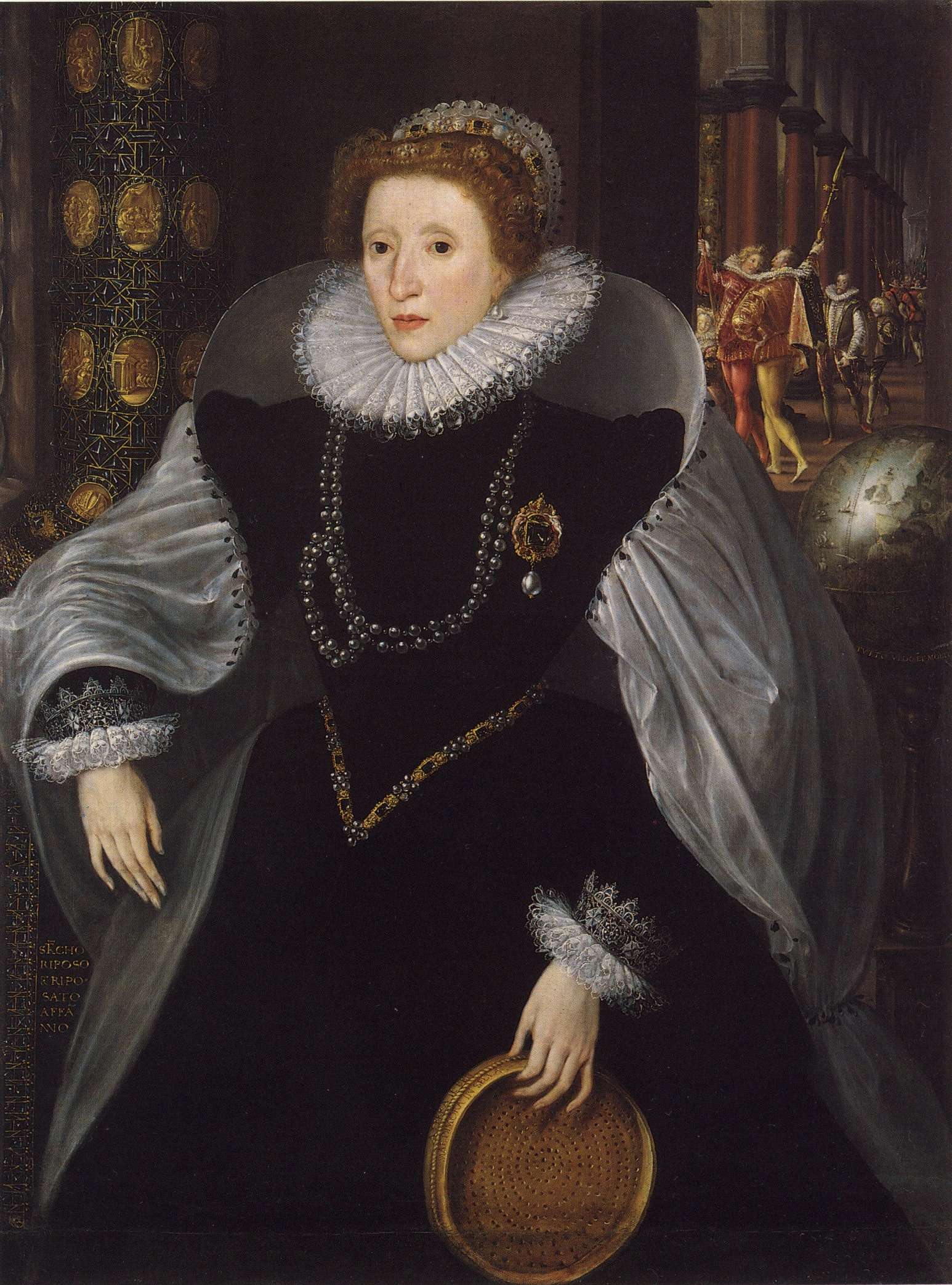
The Siena Sieve Portrait by Quentin Metsys the Younger, 1583

In the Metsys version, Elizabeth is surrounded by symbols of empire, including a column and a globe, iconography that would appear again and again in her portraiture of the 1580s and 1590s, most notably in the Armada Portrait of c. 1588. The medallions on the pillar to the left of the queen illustrate the story of Dido and Aeneas, ancestor of Brutus, suggesting that like Aeneas, Elizabeth's destiny was to reject marriage and found an empire. This painting's patron was likely Sir Christopher Hatton, as his heraldic badge of the white hind appears on the sleeve of one of the courtiers in the background, and the work may have expressed opposition to the proposed marriage of Elizabeth to François, Duke of Anjou.

The virgin Tuccia was familiar to Elizabethan readers from Petrarch's "The Triumph of Chastity". Another symbol from this work is the spotless ermine, wearing a collar of gold studded with topazes. This symbol of purity appears in the Ermine Portrait of 1585, attributed to the herald William Segar. The Queen bears the olive branch of Pax (Peace), and the sword of justice rests on the table at her side. In combination, these symbols represent not only the personal purity of Elizabeth but the "righteousness and justice of her government."

=== Visions of empire ===
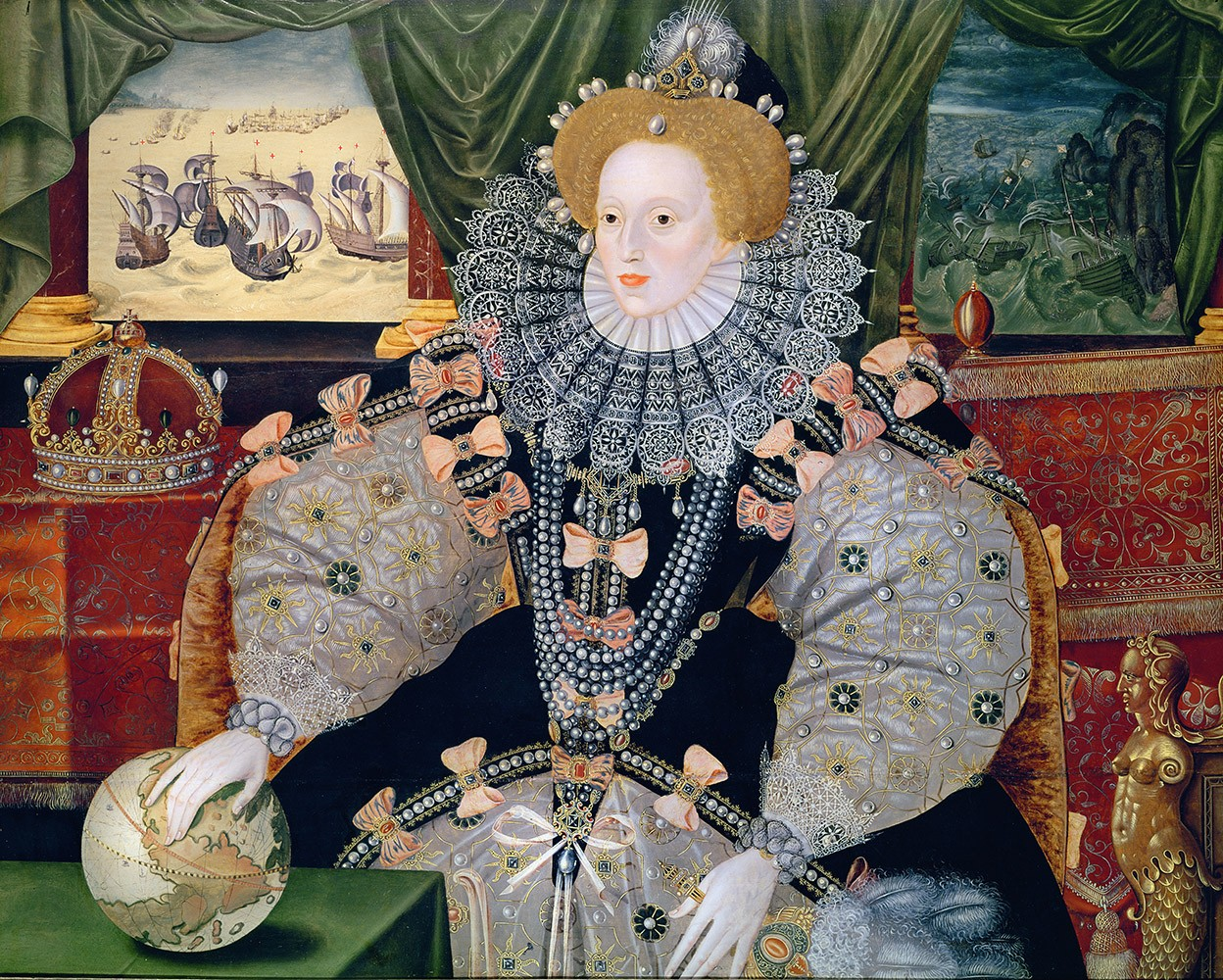
The Woburn Abbey version of the Armada Portrait, c. 1588

The Armada Portrait is an allegorical panel painting depicting the queen surrounded by symbols of empire against a backdrop representing the defeat of the Spanish Armada in 1588.

There are three surviving versions of the portrait, in addition to several derivative paintings. The version at Woburn Abbey, the seat of the Dukes of Bedford, was long accepted as the work of George Gower, who had been appointed Serjeant Painter in 1581. A version in the National Portrait Gallery, London, which had been cut down at both sides leaving just a portrait of the Queen, was also formerly attributed to Gower. A third version, owned by the Tyrwhitt-Drake family, may have been commissioned by Sir Francis Drake. Scholars agree that this version is by a different hand, noting distinctive techniques and approaches to the modelling of the queen's features. (Note: This version was heavily overpainted in the later 17th century, which complicates attribution and may account for several differences in details of the costume.) Curators now believe that the three extant versions are all the output of different workshops under the direction of unknown English artists.

The combination of a life-sized portrait of the Queen with a horizontal format is "quite unprecedented in her portraiture", although allegorical portraits in a horizontal format, such as Elizabeth I and the Three Goddesses and the Family of Henry VIII: An Allegory of the Tudor Succession pre-date the Armada Portrait.

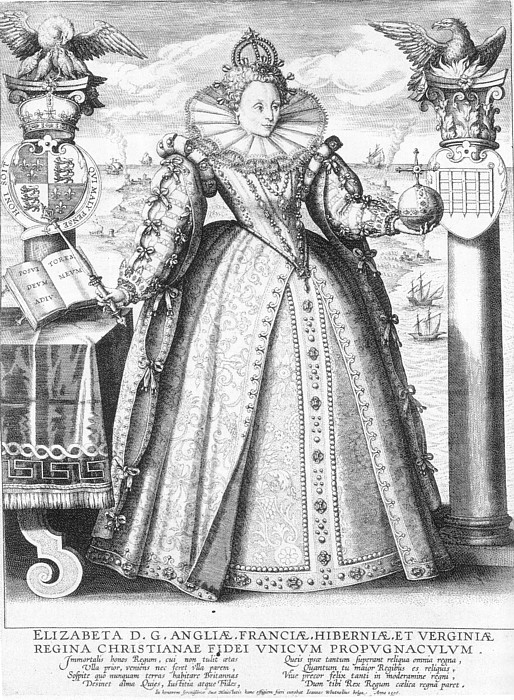
Engraving by Crispijn van de Passe, printed 1596

The queen's hand rests on a globe below the crown of England, "her fingers covering the Americas, indicating England's [command of the seas] and [dreams of establishing colonies] in the New World". The Queen is flanked by two columns behind, probably a reference to the famous impresa of the Holy Roman Emperor, Charles V, Philip II of Spain's father, which represented the pillars of Hercules, gateway to the Atlantic Ocean and the New World.

In the background view on the left, English fireships threaten the Spanish fleet, and on the right the ships are driven onto a rocky coast amid stormy seas by the "Protestant Wind". On a secondary level, these images show Elizabeth turning her back on storm and darkness while sunlight shines where she gazes.

An engraving by Crispijn van de Passe published in 1596, but showing costume of the 1580s, carries similar iconography. Elizabeth stands between two columns bearing her arms and the Tudor heraldic badge of a portcullis. The columns are surmounted by her emblems of a pelican in her piety and a phoenix, and ships fill the sea behind her.

=== The cult of Elizabeth ===
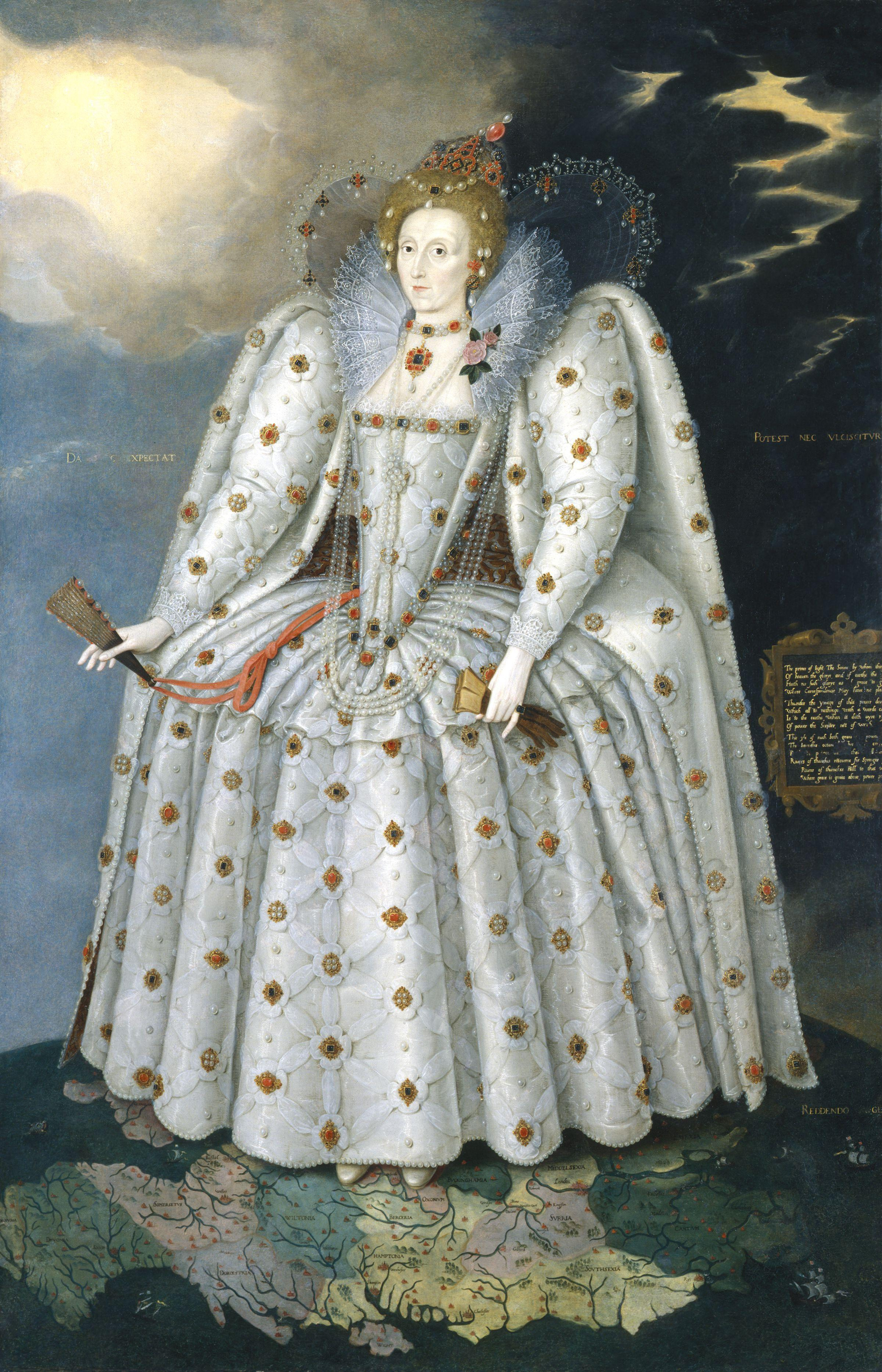
The Ditchley Portrait, Marcus Gheeraerts the Younger, c. 1592

The various threads of mythology and symbolism that created the iconography of Elizabeth I combined into a tapestry of immense complexity in the years following the defeat of the Spanish Armada. In poetry, portraiture and pageantry, the queen was celebrated as Astraea, the just virgin, and simultaneously as Venus, the goddess of love. Another exaltation of the queen's virgin purity identified her with the moon goddess, who held dominion over the waters. Sir Walter Raleigh had begun to use Diana, and later Cynthia, as aliases for the Queen in his poetry around 1580, and images of Elizabeth with jewels in the shape of crescent moons or the huntress's arrows begin to appear in portraiture around 1586 and multiply through the remainder of the reign. Courtiers wore the image of the Queen to signify their devotion, and had their portraits painted wearing her colours of black and white.

The Ditchley Portrait seems to have always been at the Oxfordshire home of Elizabeth's retired Champion, Sir Henry Lee of Ditchley, and likely was painted for (or commemorates) her two-day visit to Ditchley Park in 1592. The painting is attributed to Marcus Gheeraerts the Younger, and was almost certainly based on a sitting arranged by Lee, who was the painter's patron. In this image, the Queen stands on a map of England, her feet on Oxfordshire. The painting has been trimmed and the background poorly repainted, so that the inscription and sonnet are incomplete. Storms rage behind her while the sun shines before her, and she wears a jewel in the form of a celestial or armillary sphere close to her left ear. Many versions of this painting were made, likely in Gheeraerts' workshop, with the allegorical items removed and Elizabeth's features "softened" from the stark realism of her face in the original. One of these was sent as a diplomatic gift to Ferdinando I de' Medici, Grand Duke of Tuscany, and is now in the Palazzo Pitti.

=== The last sitting and the Mask of Youth ===
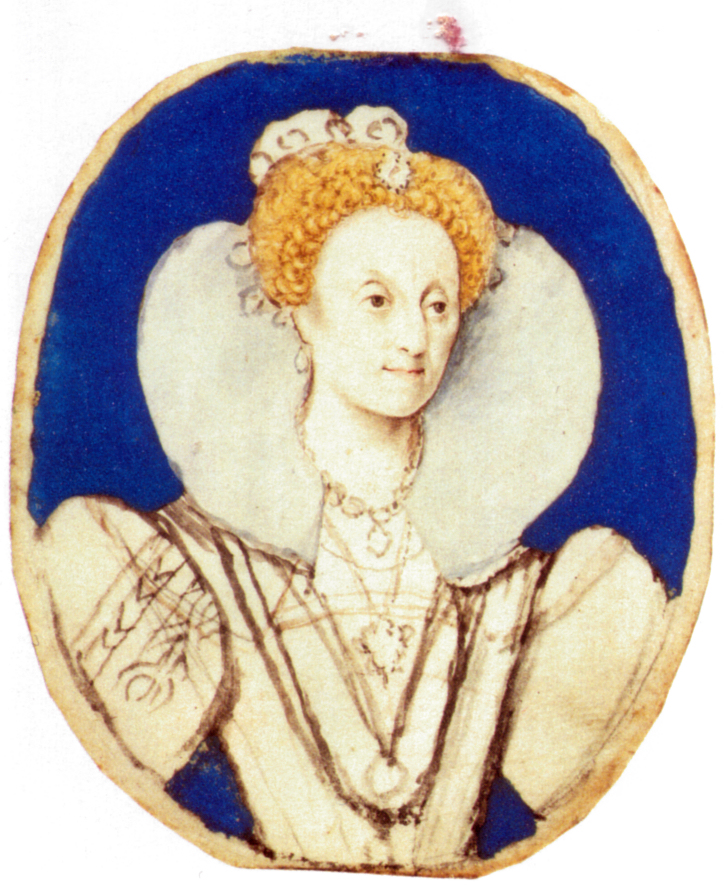
The unfinished miniature by Isaac Oliver, c. 1592

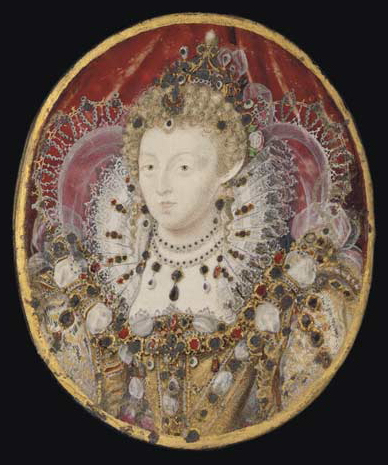
Recently discovered miniature by Hilliard, 1595–1600

Around 1592, the Queen also sat for Isaac Oliver, a pupil of Hilliard, who produced an unfinished portrait miniature used as a pattern for engravings of the Queen. Only a single finished miniature from this pattern survives, with the Queen's features softened, and Strong concludes that this realistic image from life of the aging Elizabeth was not deemed a success.

Prior to the 1590s, woodcuts and engravings of the queen were created as book illustrations, but in this decade individual prints of the Queen first appear, based on the Oliver face pattern. In 1596, the Privy Council ordered that unseemly portraits of the Queen which had caused her "great offence" should be sought out and burnt, and Strong suggest that these prints, of which comparatively few survive, may be the offending images. Strong writes "It must have been exposure to the searching realism of both Gheeraerts and Oliver that provoked the decision to suppress all likenesses of the Queen that depicted her as being in any way old and hence subject to mortality."

In any event, no surviving portraits dated between 1596 and Elizabeth's death in 1603 show the aging Queen as she truly was. Faithful resemblance to the original is only to be found in the accounts of contemporaries, as in the report written in 1597 by André Hurault de Maisse, Ambassador Extraordinary from Henry IV of France, after an audience with the 64-year-old queen, during which he noted, "her teeth are very yellow and unequal ... and on the left side less than on the right. Many of them are missing, so that one cannot understand her easily when she speaks quickly." Yet he added, "her figure is fair and tall and graceful in whatever she does; so far as may be she keeps her dignity, yet humbly and graciously withal." All subsequent images rely on a face pattern devised by Nicholas Hilliard sometime in the 1590s called by art historians the "Mask of Youth", portraying Elizabeth as ever-young. Some 16 miniatures by Hilliard and his studio are known based on this face pattern, with different combinations of costume and jewels likely painted from life, and it was also adopted by (or enforced on) other artists associated with the Court.

=== The coronation portraits ===
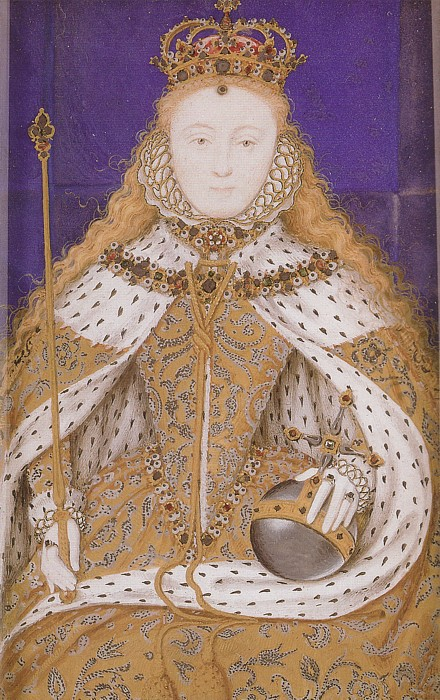
Hilliard, c. 1600

Two portraits of Elizabeth in her coronation robes survive, both dated to 1600 or shortly thereafter. One is a panel portrait in oils, and the other is a miniature by Nicholas Hilliard. The warrant to the Queen's tailor for remodelling Mary I's cloth of gold coronation robes for Elizabeth survives, and costume historian Janet Arnold's study points out that the paintings accurately reflect the written records, although the jewels differ in the two paintings, suggesting two different sources, one possibly a miniature by Levina Teerlinc. It is not known why, and for whom, these portraits were created, at, or just after, the end of her reign.

=== The Rainbow Portrait ===
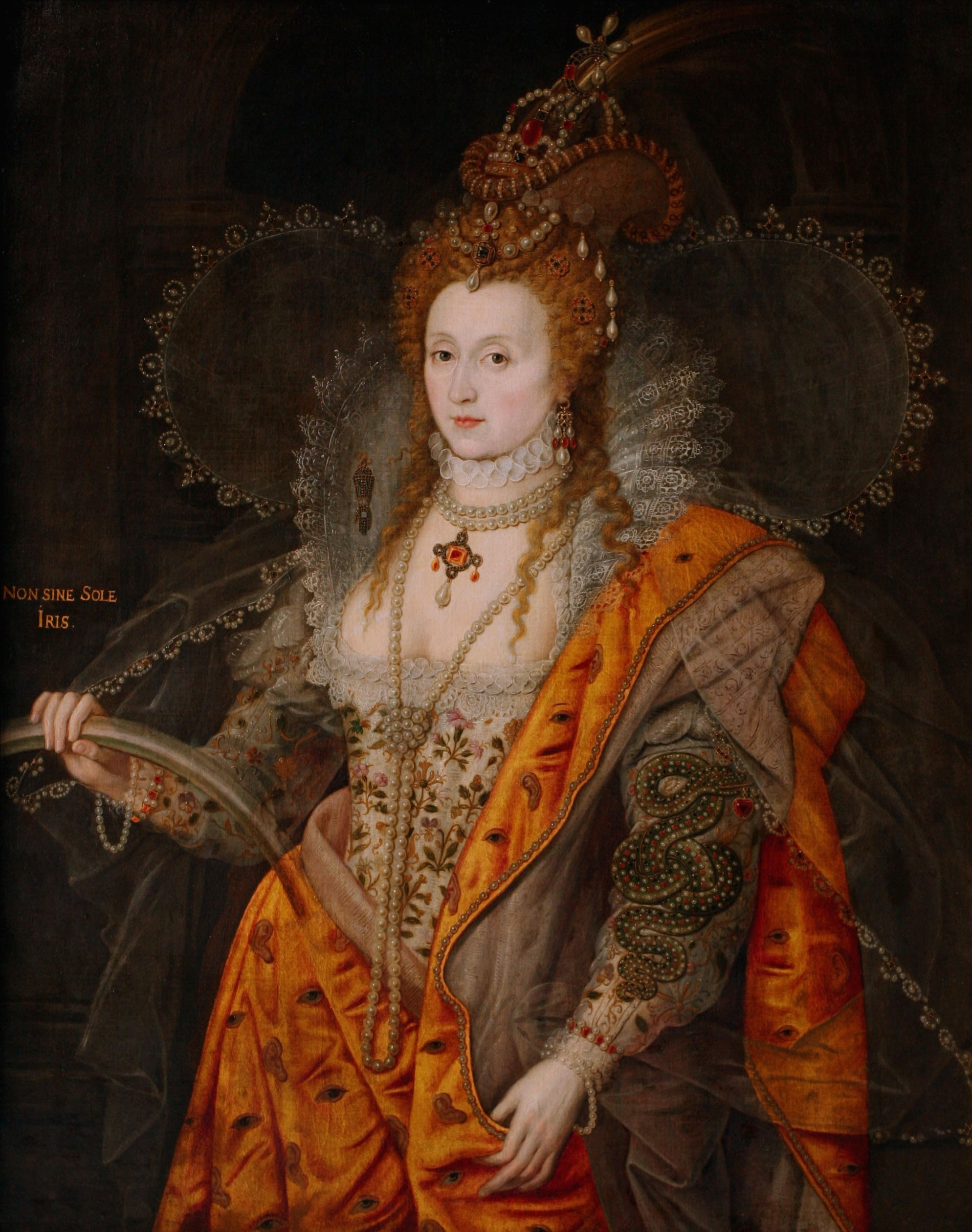
The Rainbow Portrait, c. 1600–02, attributed to Marcus Gheeraerts the Younger

Attributed to Marcus Gheeraerts the Younger, perhaps the most heavily symbolic portrait of the Queen is the Rainbow Portrait, so-called because the queen grasps a rainbow, at Hatfield House. It was painted around 1600–1602, when the Queen was in her sixties. In this painting, an ageless Elizabeth appears dressed as if for a masque, in a linen bodice embroidered with spring flowers and an Irish mantle draped over one shoulder, her hair loose beneath a fantastical headdress. She wears symbols out of the popular emblem books, including the cloak with eyes and ears, the serpent of wisdom, and the celestial armillary sphere, and carries a rainbow with the motto non sine sole iris ("no rainbow without the sun"). A jewelled glove pinned to her ruff may be Thomas Perrot's 1582 New Year's Day gift of a gauntlet embroidered with seed pearls and sparks of diamonds, or refer more generally to knightly culture and tilts at court.

Roy Strong suggests that the complex "programme" for this image may be the work of the poet John Davies, whose Hymns to Astraea honouring the queen use much of the same imagery, and suggests it was commissioned by Robert Cecil as part of the decor for Elizabeth's visit in 1602, when a "shrine to Astraea" featured in the entertainments of what would prove to be the "last great festival of the reign".

== Books and coins ==
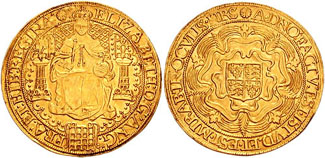
Gold sovereign of 1585

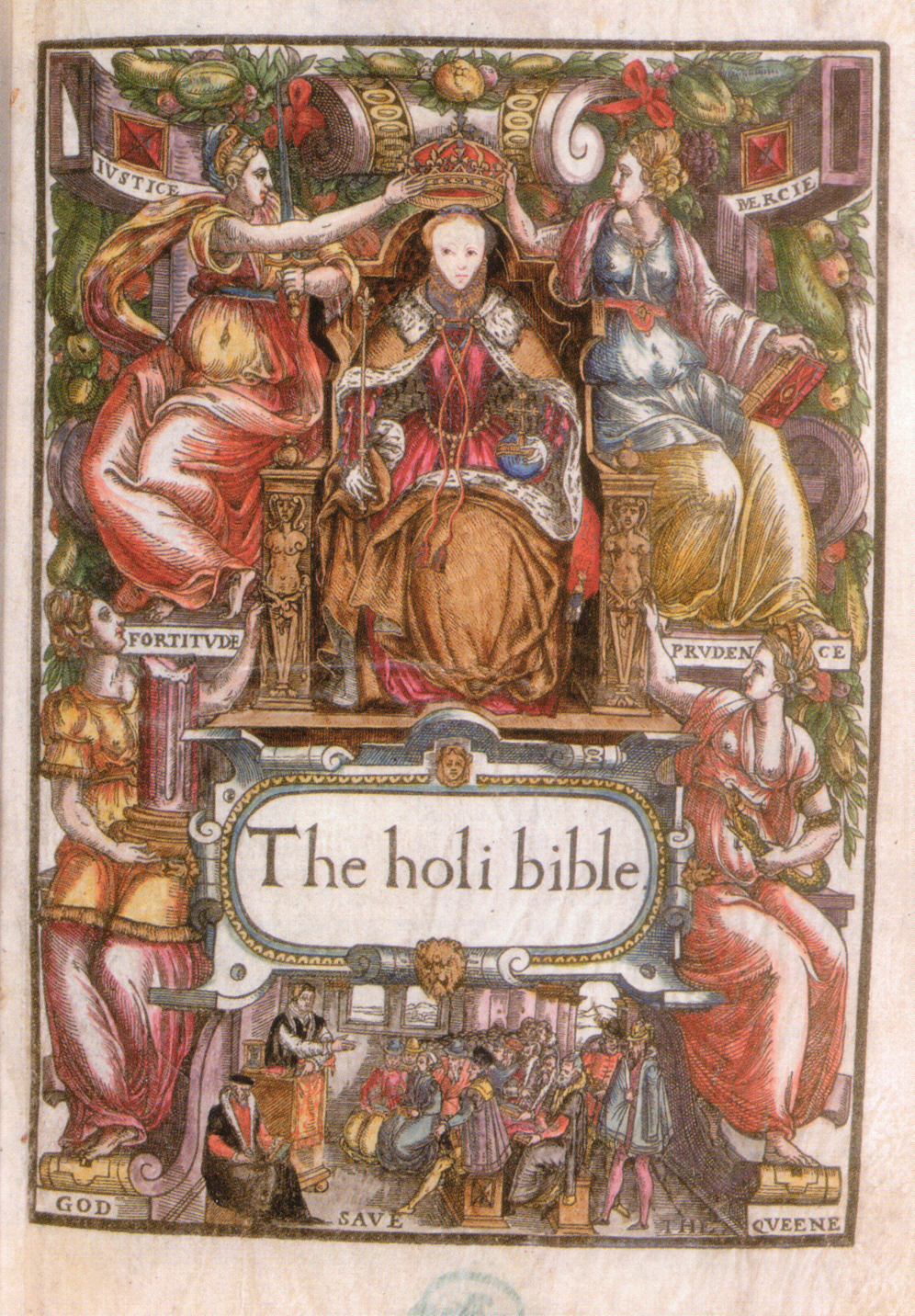
Coloured title page of the Bishops' Bible, 1569, British Museum.

Prior to the wide dissemination of prints of the Queen in the 1590s, the common people of Elizabeth's England would be most familiar with her image on the coinage. In December 1560, a systematic recoinage of the debased money then in circulation was begun. The main early effort was the issuance of sterling silver shillings and groats, but new coins were issued in both silver and gold. This restoration of the currency was one of the three principal achievements noted on Elizabeth's tomb, illustrating the value of stable currency to her contemporaries. Later coinage represented the queen in iconic fashion, with the traditional accompaniments of Tudor heraldic badges including the Tudor rose and portcullis.

Books provided another widely available source of images of Elizabeth. Her portrait appeared on the title page of the Bishops' Bible, the standard Bible of the Church of England, issued in 1568 and revised in 1572. In various editions, Elizabeth is depicted with her orb and sceptre accompanied by female personifications.

== "Reading" the portraits ==
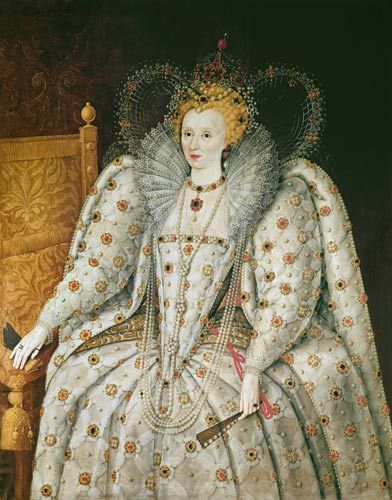
Portrait in the Palazzo Pitti, Florence

The many portraits of Elizabeth I constitute a tradition of image highly steeped in classical mythology and the Renaissance understanding of English history and destiny, filtered by allusions to Petrarch's sonnets and, late in her reign, to Edmund Spenser's Faerie Queene. This mythology and symbology, though directly understood by Elizabethan contemporaries for its political and symbolic meaning, makes it difficult to 'read' the portraits in the present day as contemporaries would have seen them at the time of their creation. Though knowledge of the symbology of Elizabethan portraits has not been lost, Dame Frances Yates points out that the most complexly symbolic portraits may all commemorate specific events, or have been designed as part of elaborately themed entertainments, knowledge left unrecorded within the paintings themselves. The most familiar images of Elizabeth—the Armada, Ditchley, and Rainbow portraits—are all associated with unique events in this way. To the extent that the contexts of other portraits have been lost to scholars, so too the keys to understanding these remarkable images as the Elizabethans understood them may be lost in time; even those portraits that are not overtly allegorical may have been full of meaning to a discerning eye. Elizabethan courtiers familiar with the language of flowers and the Italian emblem books could have read stories in the flowers the queen carried, the embroidery on her clothes, and the design of her jewels.

According to Strong:

Fear of the wrong use and perception of the visual image dominates the Elizabethan age. The old pre-Reformation idea of images, religious ones, was that they partook of the essence of what they depicted. Any advance in technique which could reinforce that experience was embraced. That was now reversed, indeed it may account for the Elizabethans failing to take cognisance of the optical advances which created the art of the Italian Renaissance. They certainly knew about these things but, and this is central to the understanding of the Elizabethans, chose not to employ them. Instead the visual arts retreated in favour of presenting a series of signs or symbols through which the viewer was meant to pass to an understanding of the idea behind the work. In this manner the visual arts were verbalised, turned into a form of book, a 'text' which called for reading by the onlooker. There are no better examples of this than the quite extraordinary portraits of the queen herself, which increasingly, as the reign progressed, took on the form of collections of abstract pattern and symbols disposed in an unnaturalistic manner for the viewer to unravel, and by doing so enter into an inner vision of the idea of monarchy.

== Gallery ==
=== Queen and court ===
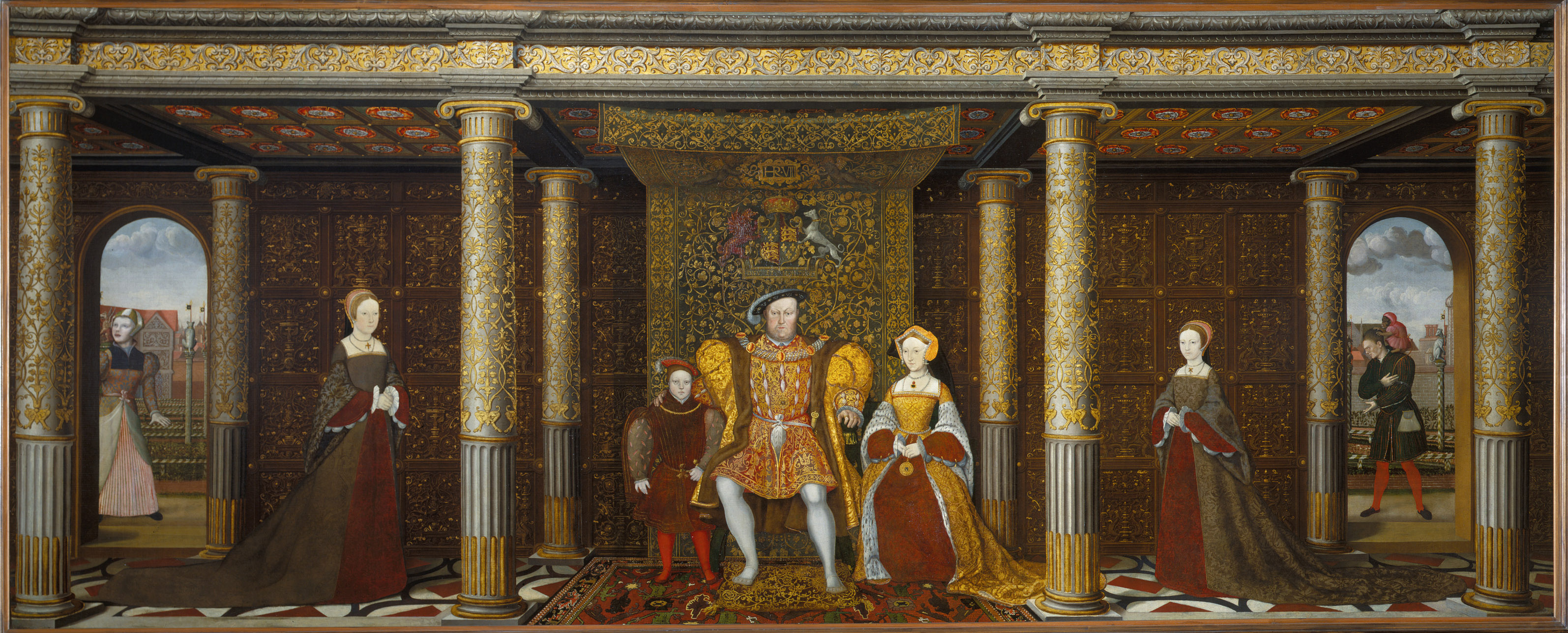
Unknown artist, The Family of Henry VIII, with Elizabeth on the right, c. 1545

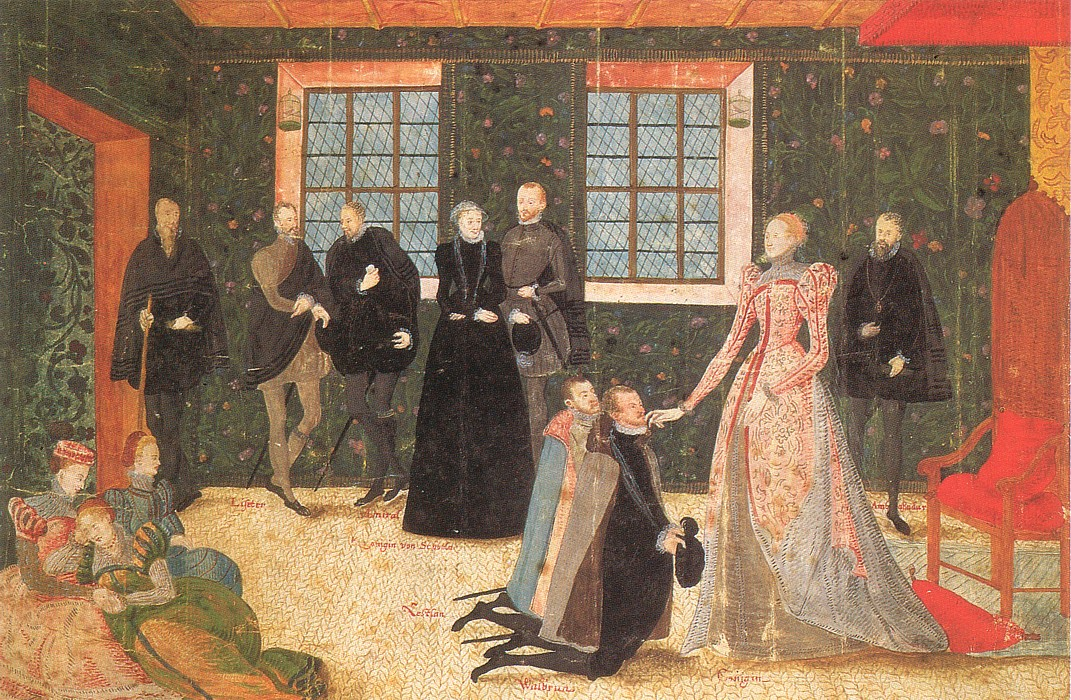
Elizabeth and the Ambassadors, attributed to Levina Teerlinc, c. 1560

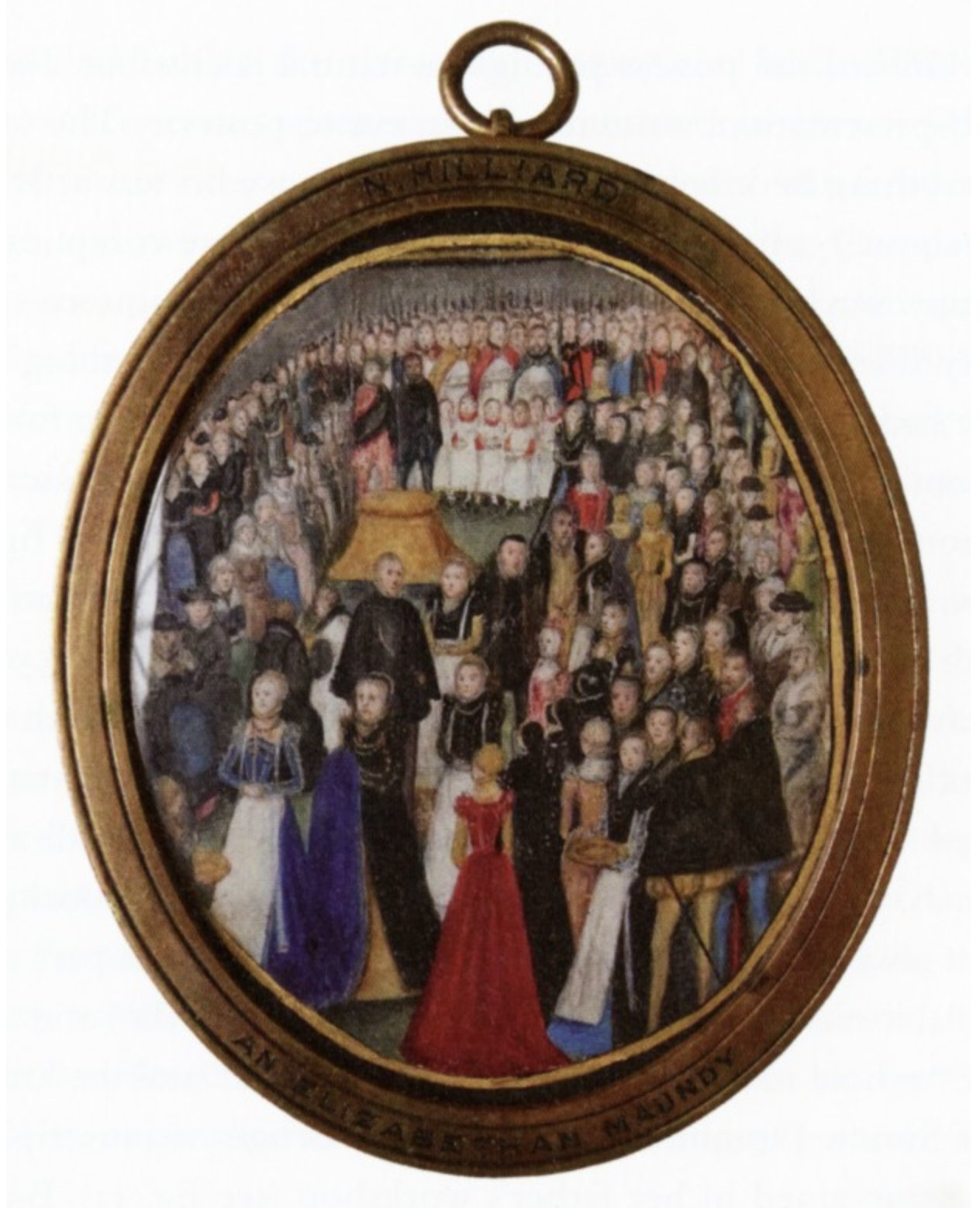
An Elizabethan Maundy, miniature by Teerlinc, c. 1560

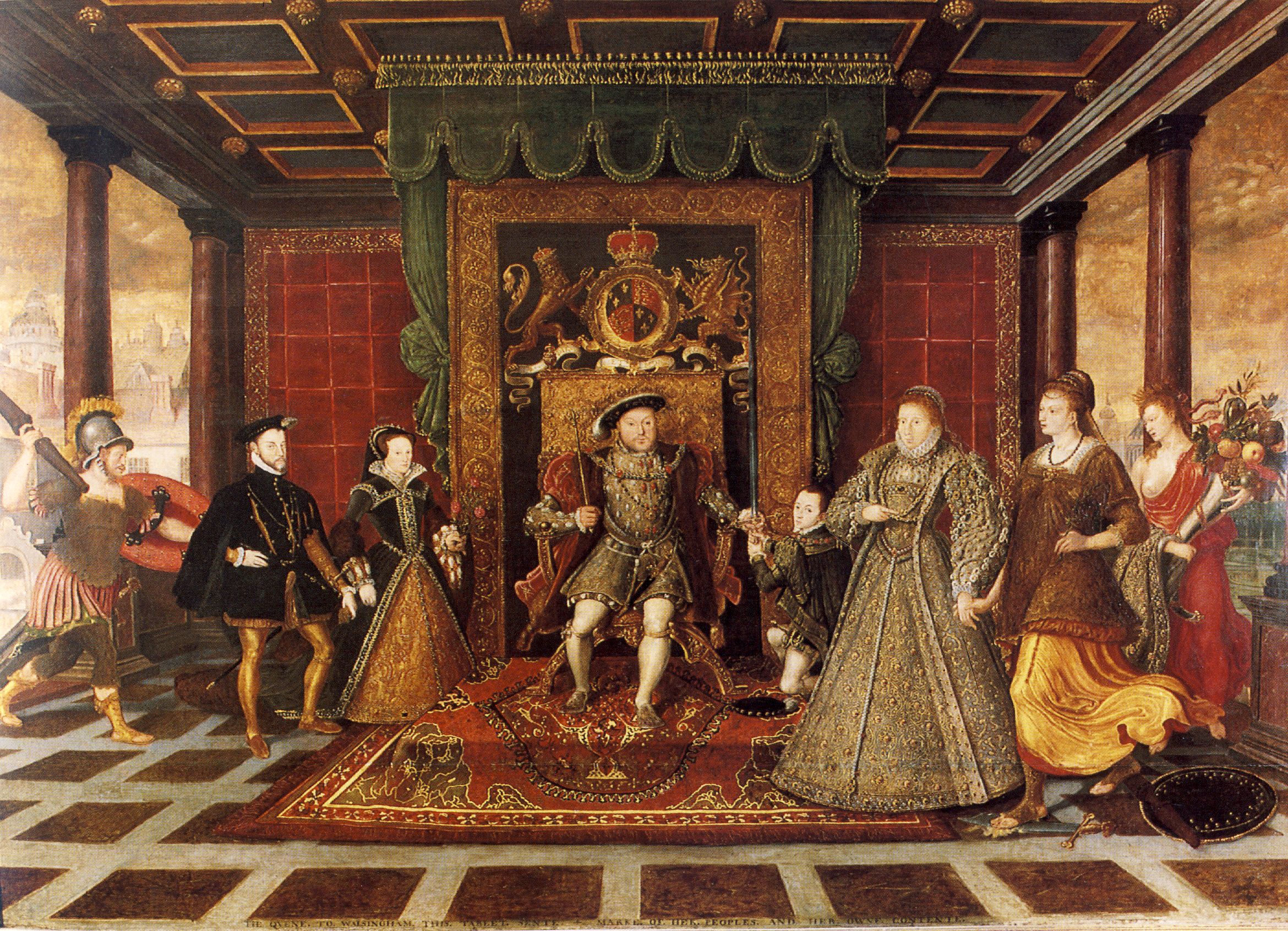
The Family of Henry VIII, an Allegory of the Tudor Succession, 1572, attributed to Lucas de Heere

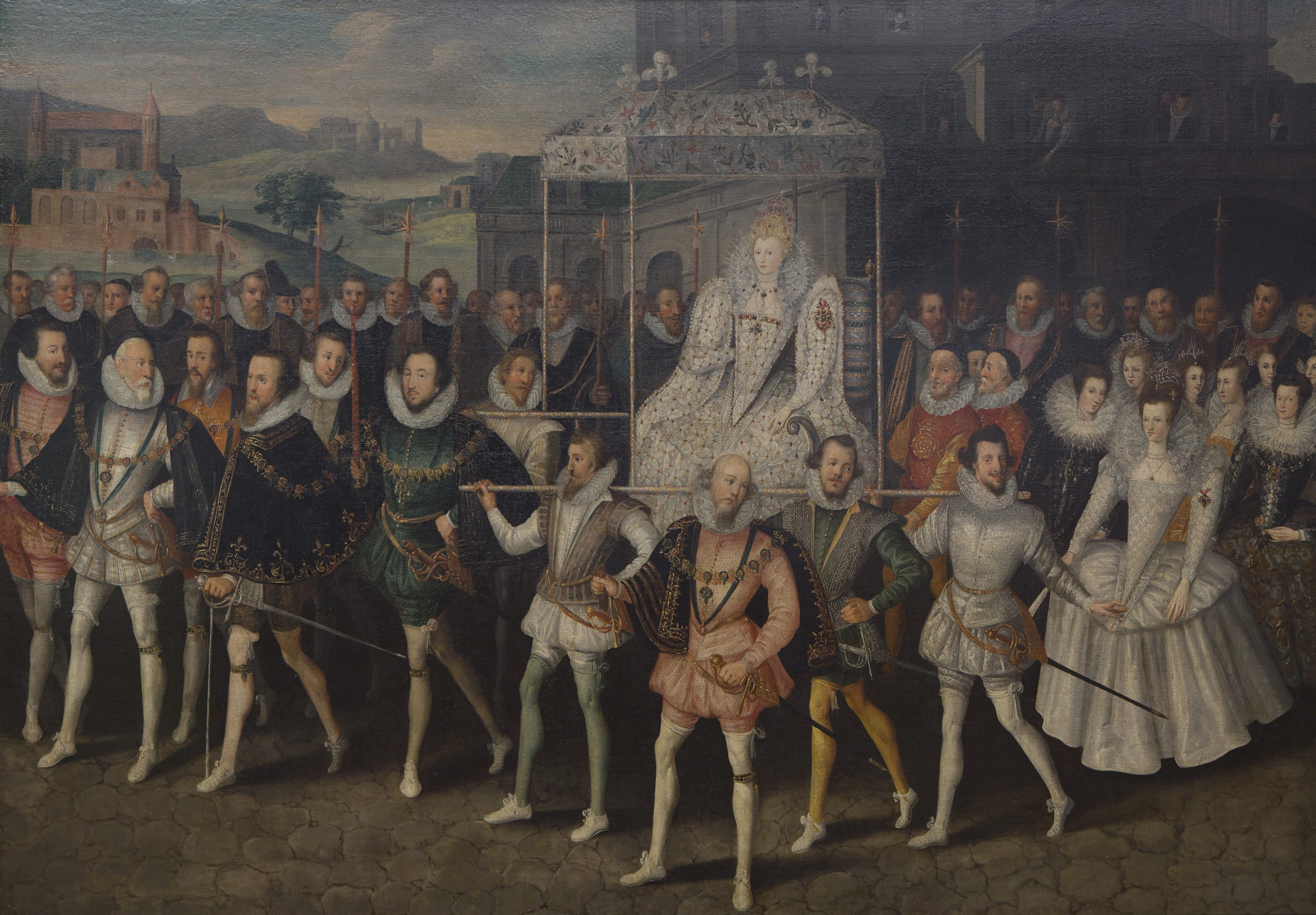
The Procession Portrait, c. 1600, attributed to Robert Peake the Elder

=== Portrait miniatures ===
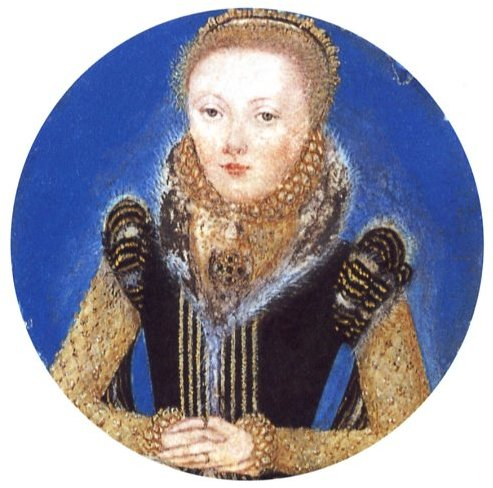
Teerlinc, c. 1565

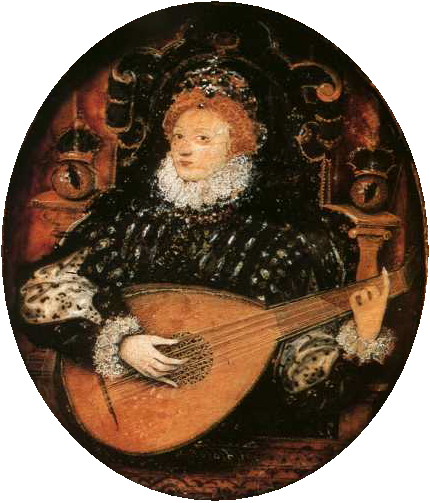
Hilliard, c. 1580

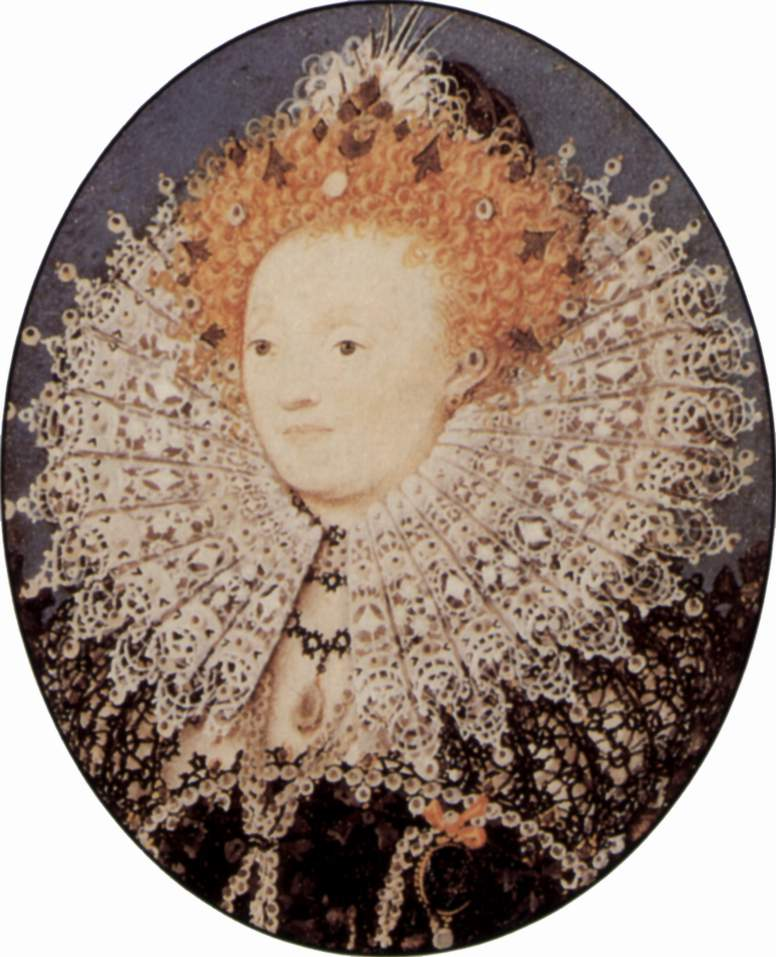
Hilliard, c. 1587

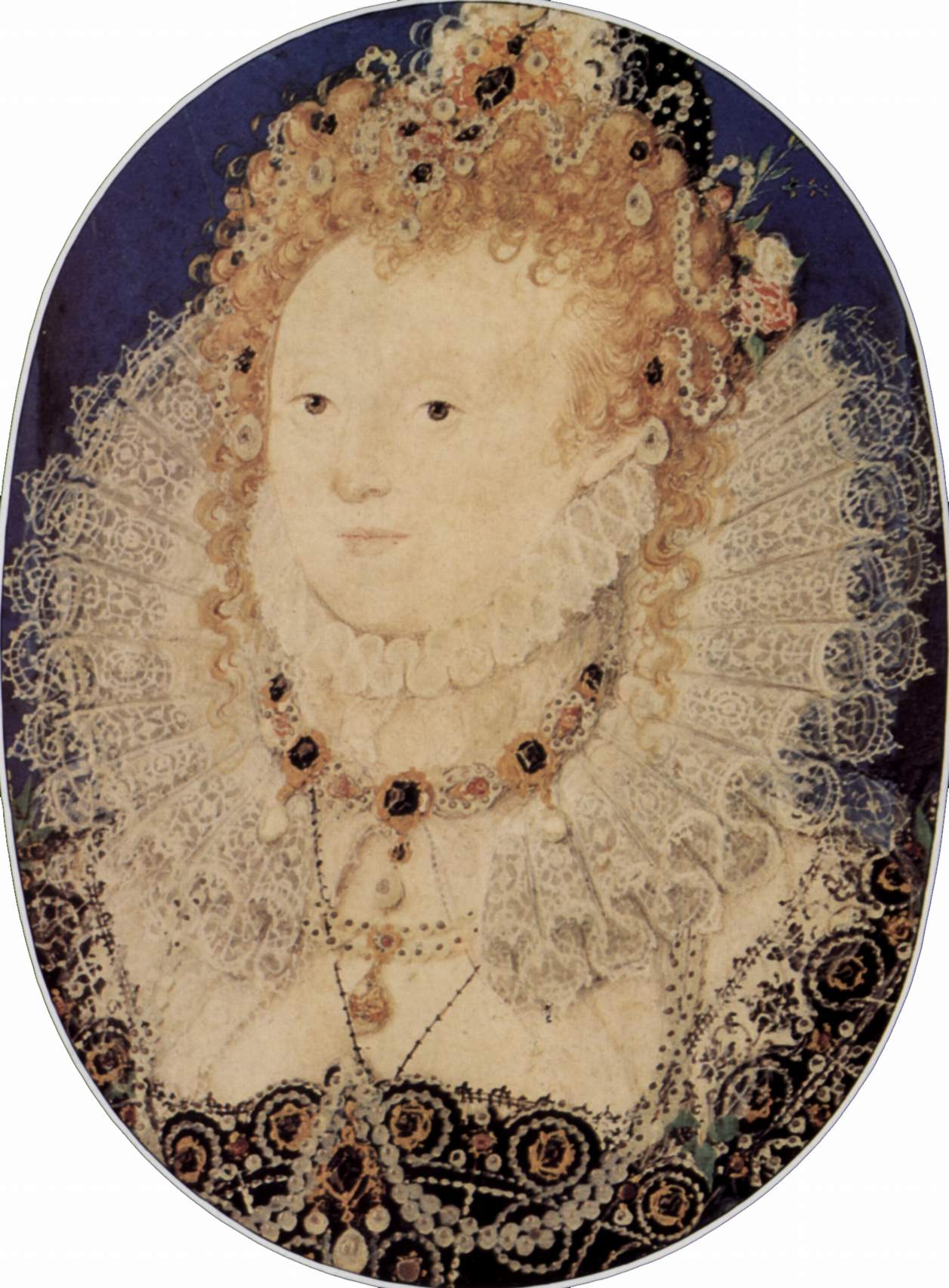
Hilliard, c. 1590

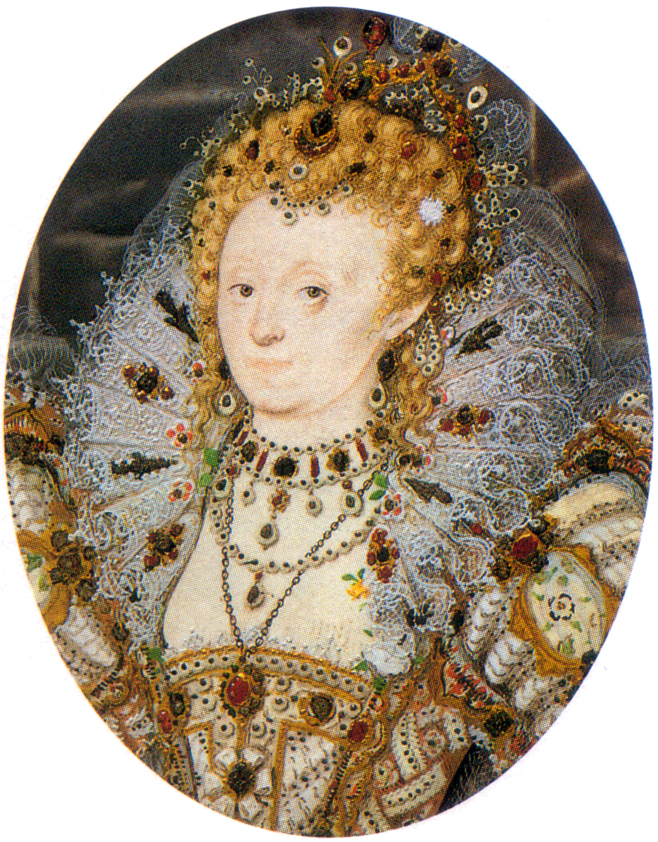
Hilliard, 1595–1600

=== Portraits ===
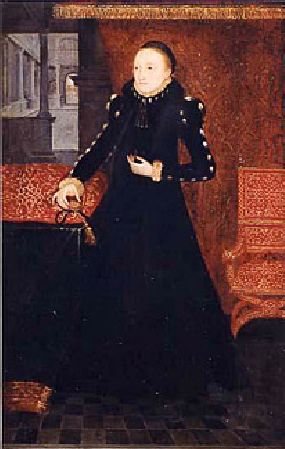
Unknown artist, c. 1559

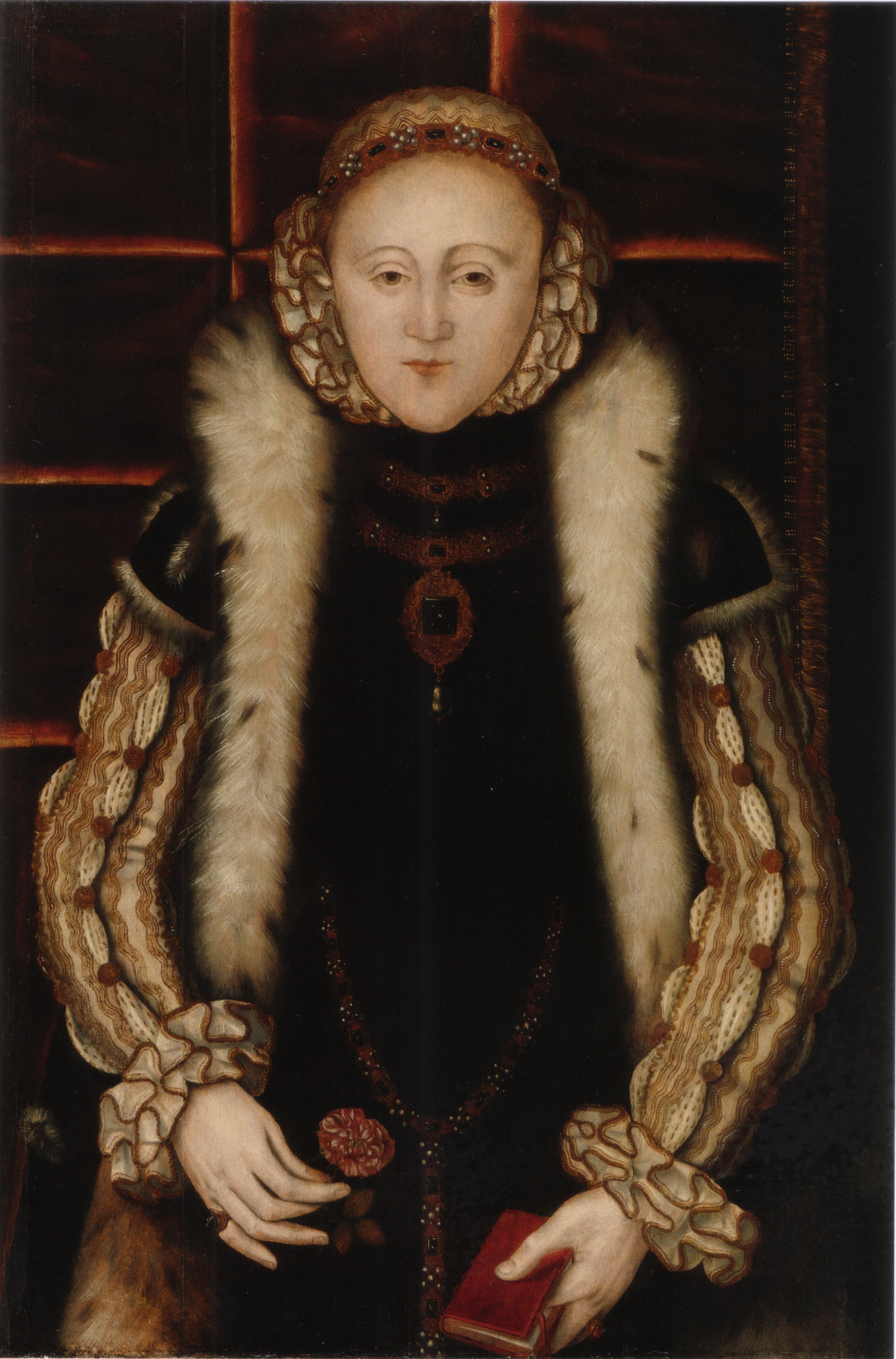
c. 1560

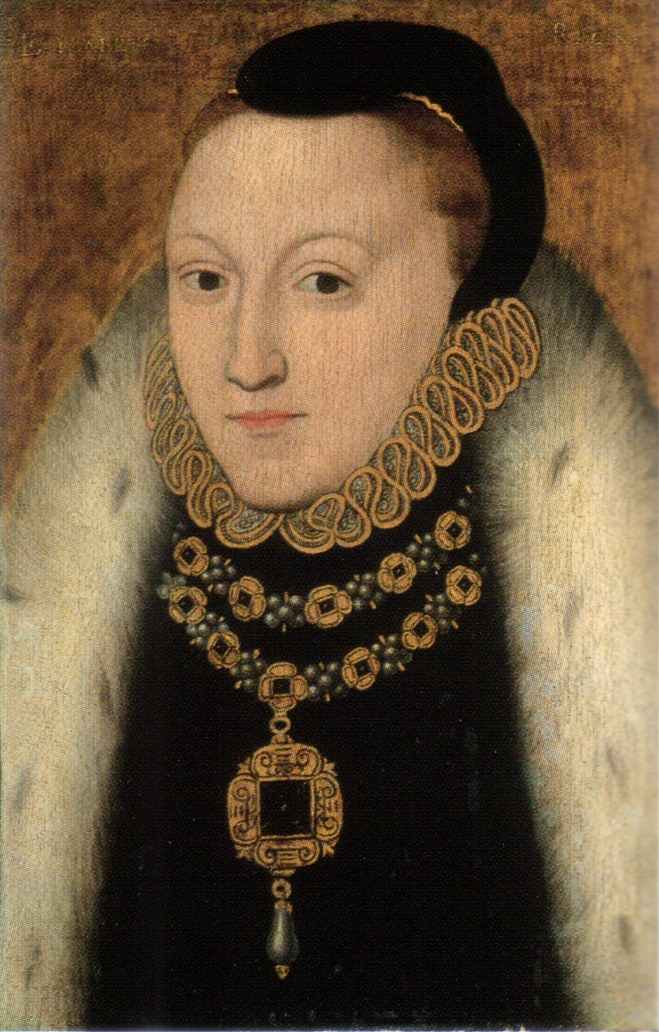
Unknown artist, 1560–65

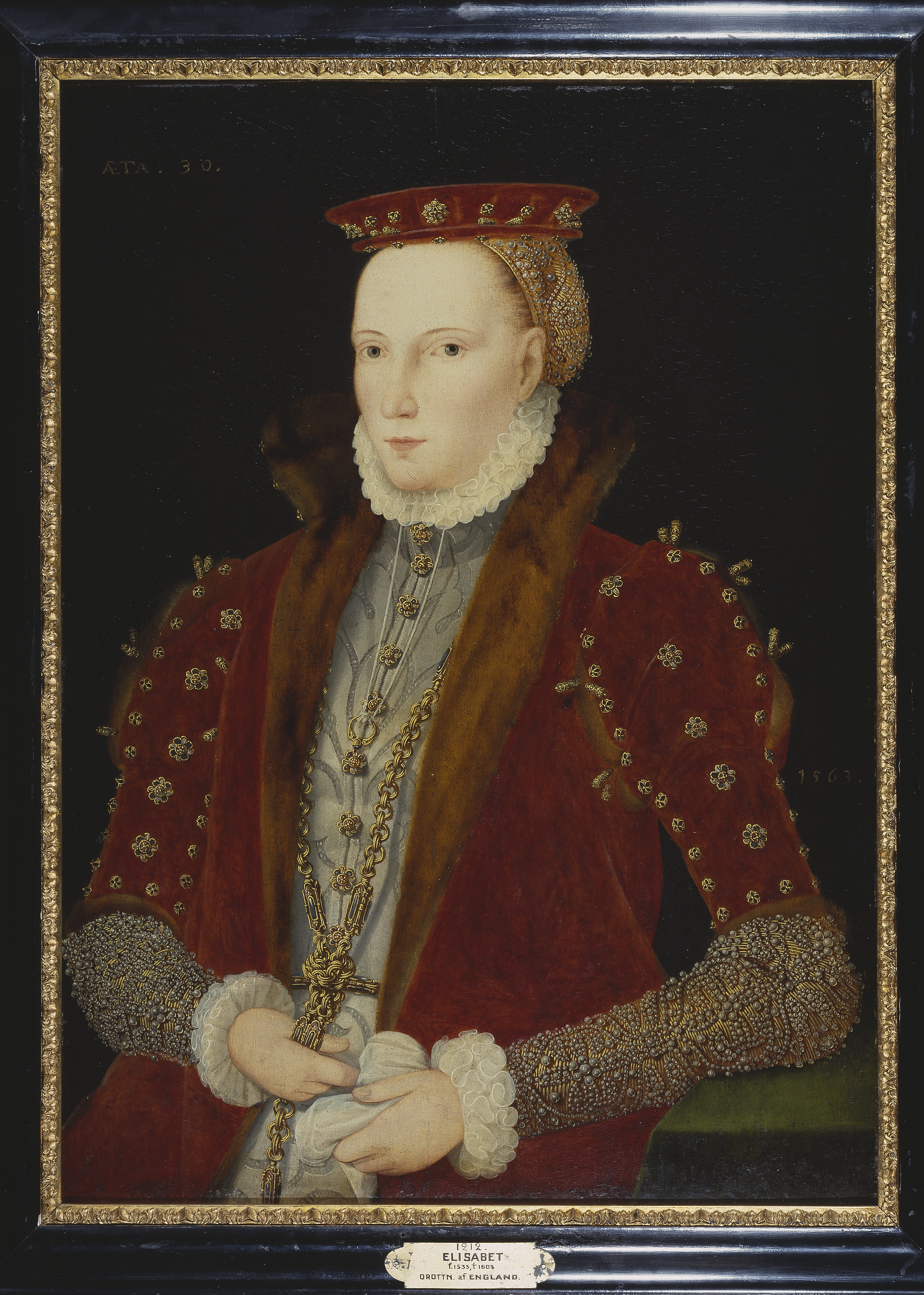
The Gripsholm Portrait, 1563

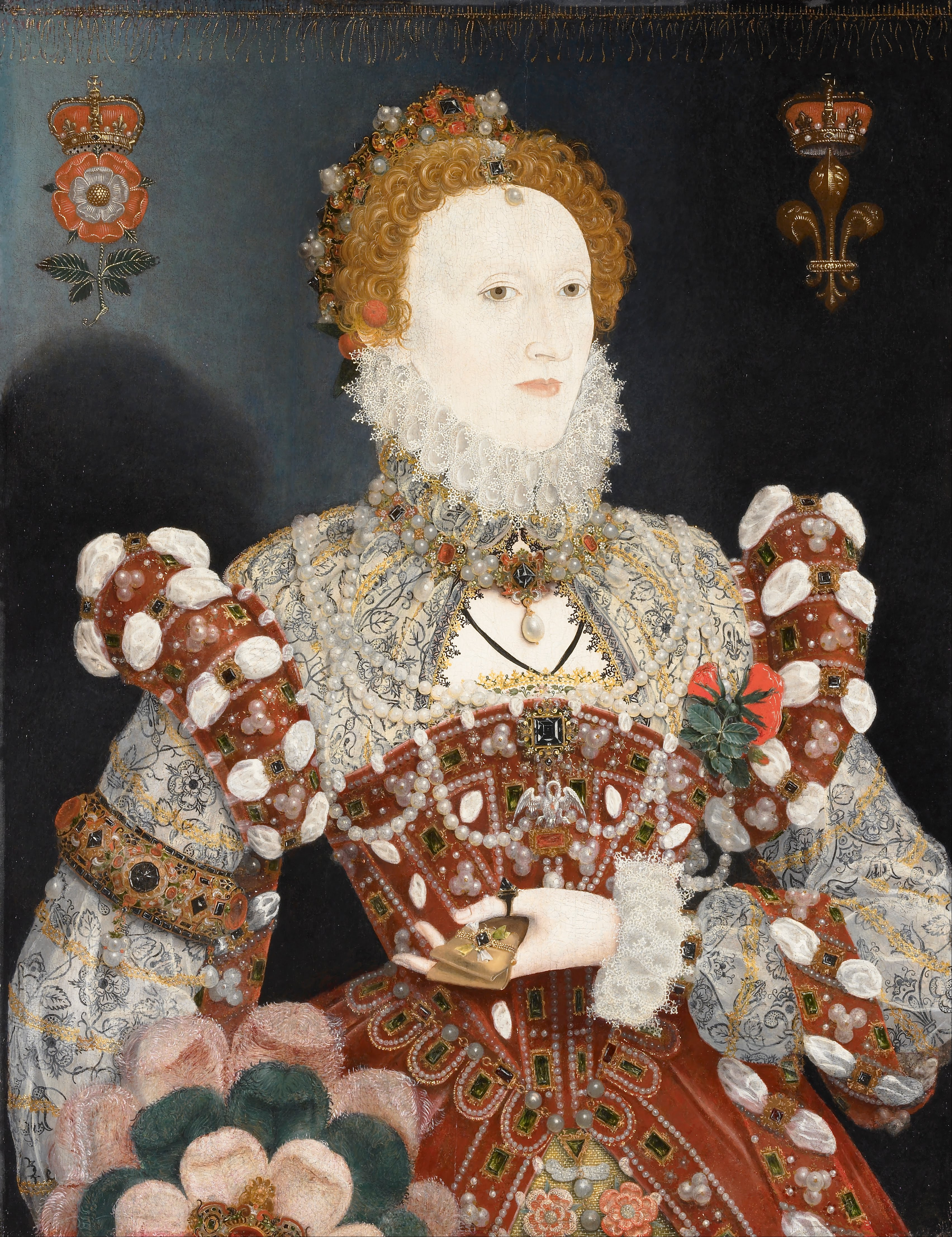
The Pelican Portrait, c. 1575, probably by Nicholas Hilliard

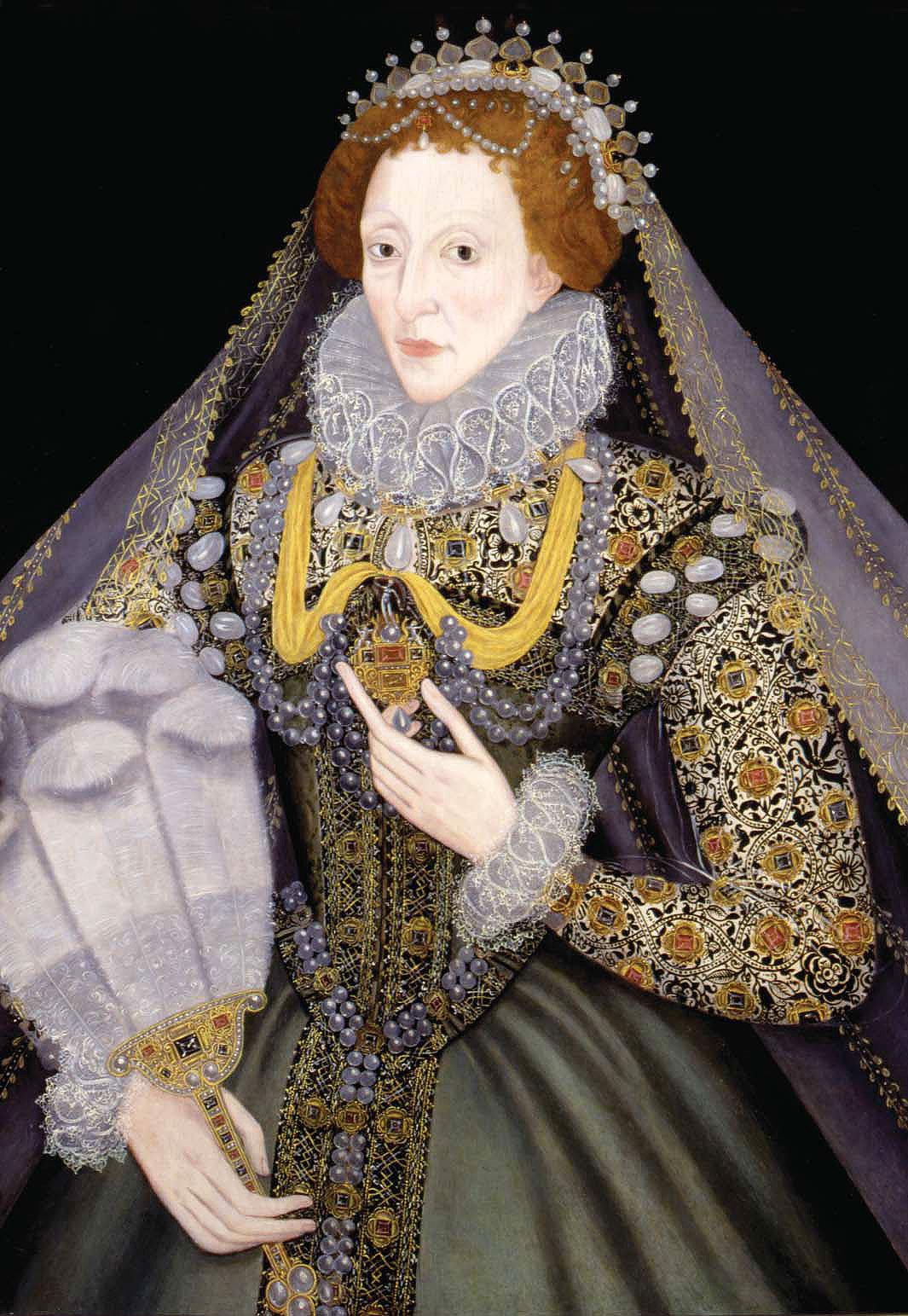
Unknown artist, 1570s

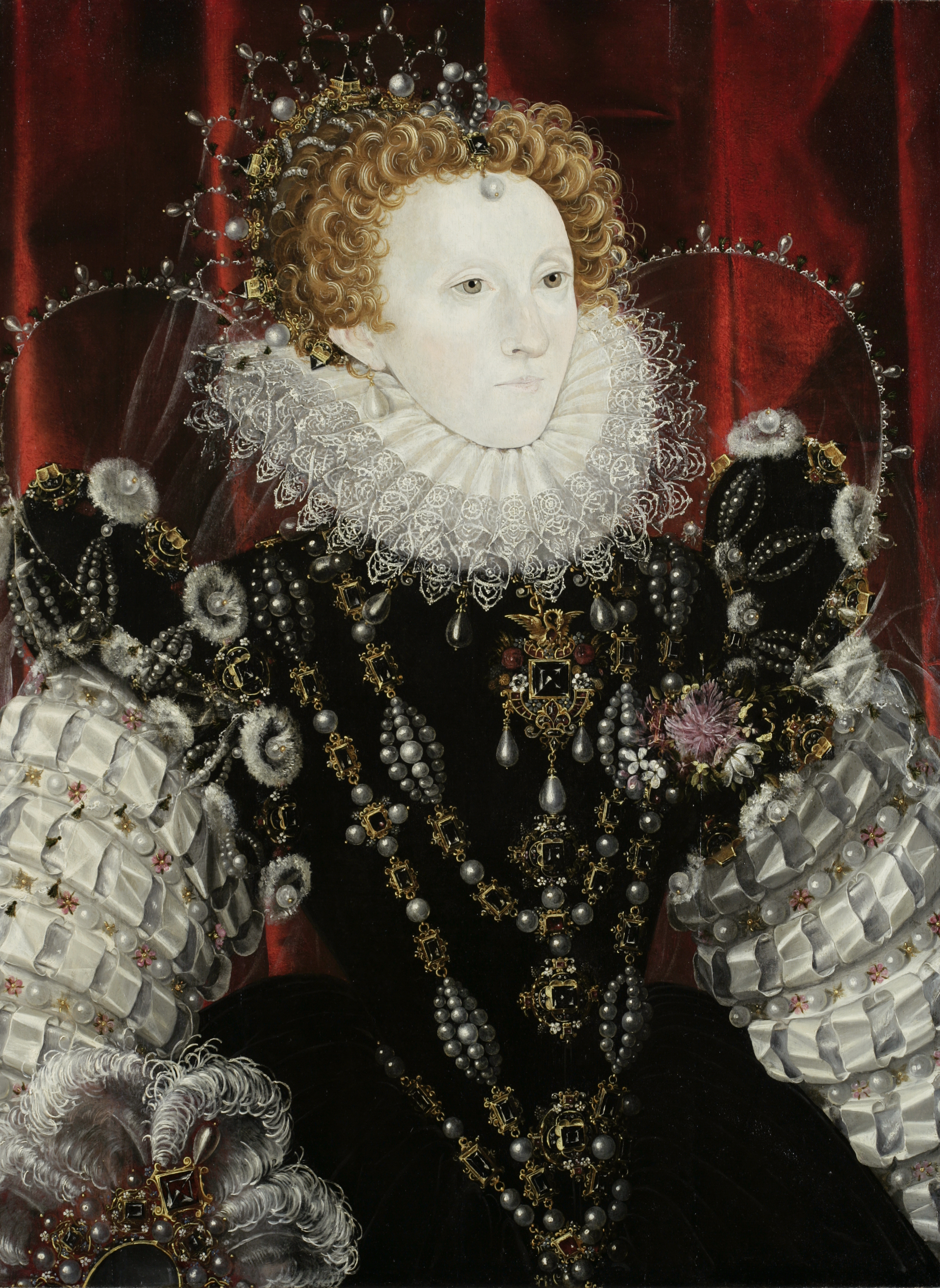
Nicholas Hilliard, c. 1576-78

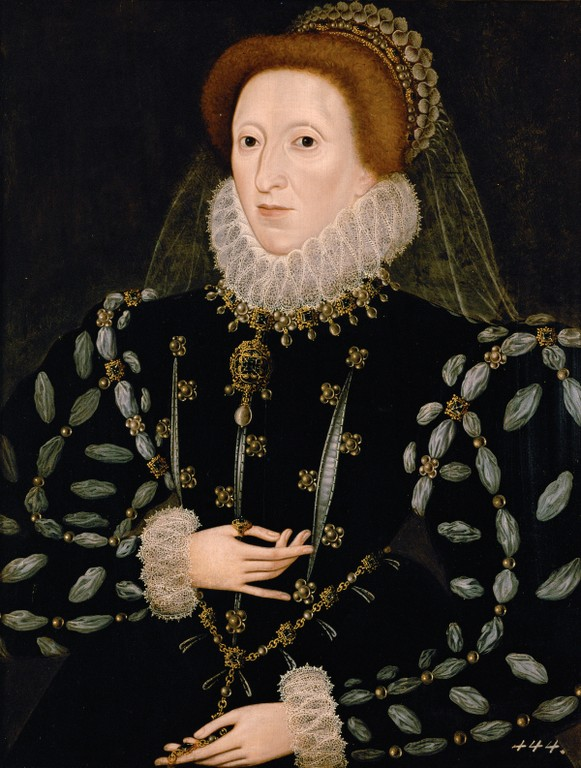
The Schloss Ambras Portrait, unknown artist, 1575–80

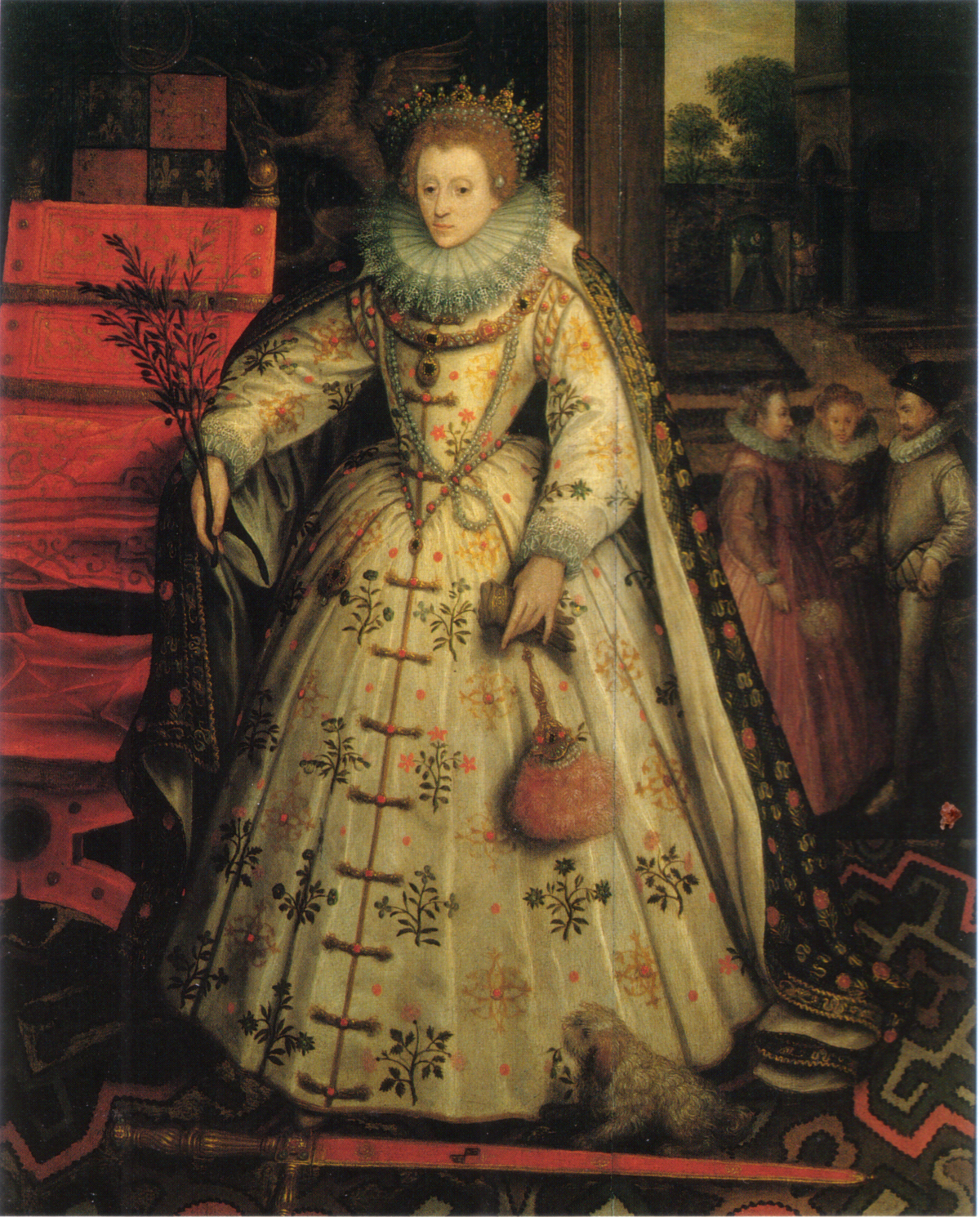
The Welbeck or Wanstead Portrait, 1580–85, Marcus Gheeraerts the Elder. Elizabeth holds the olive branch of peace.

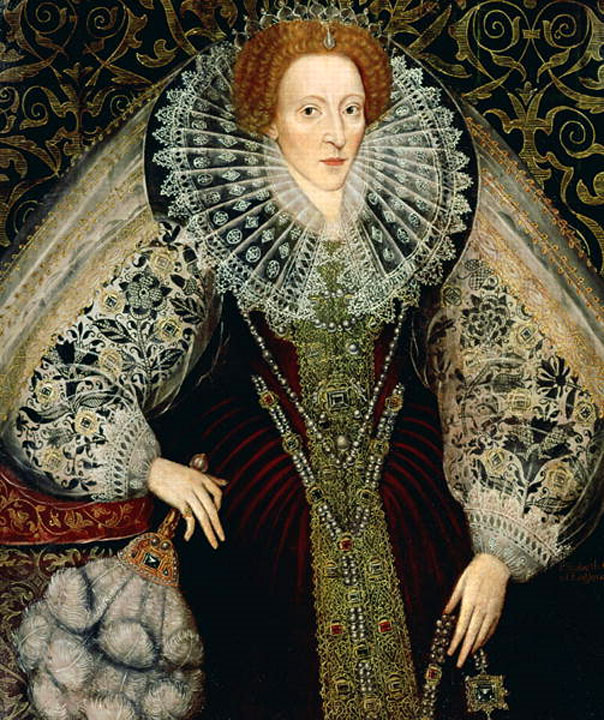
One of five known portraits attributed to John Bettes the Younger or his studio, c. 1585–90

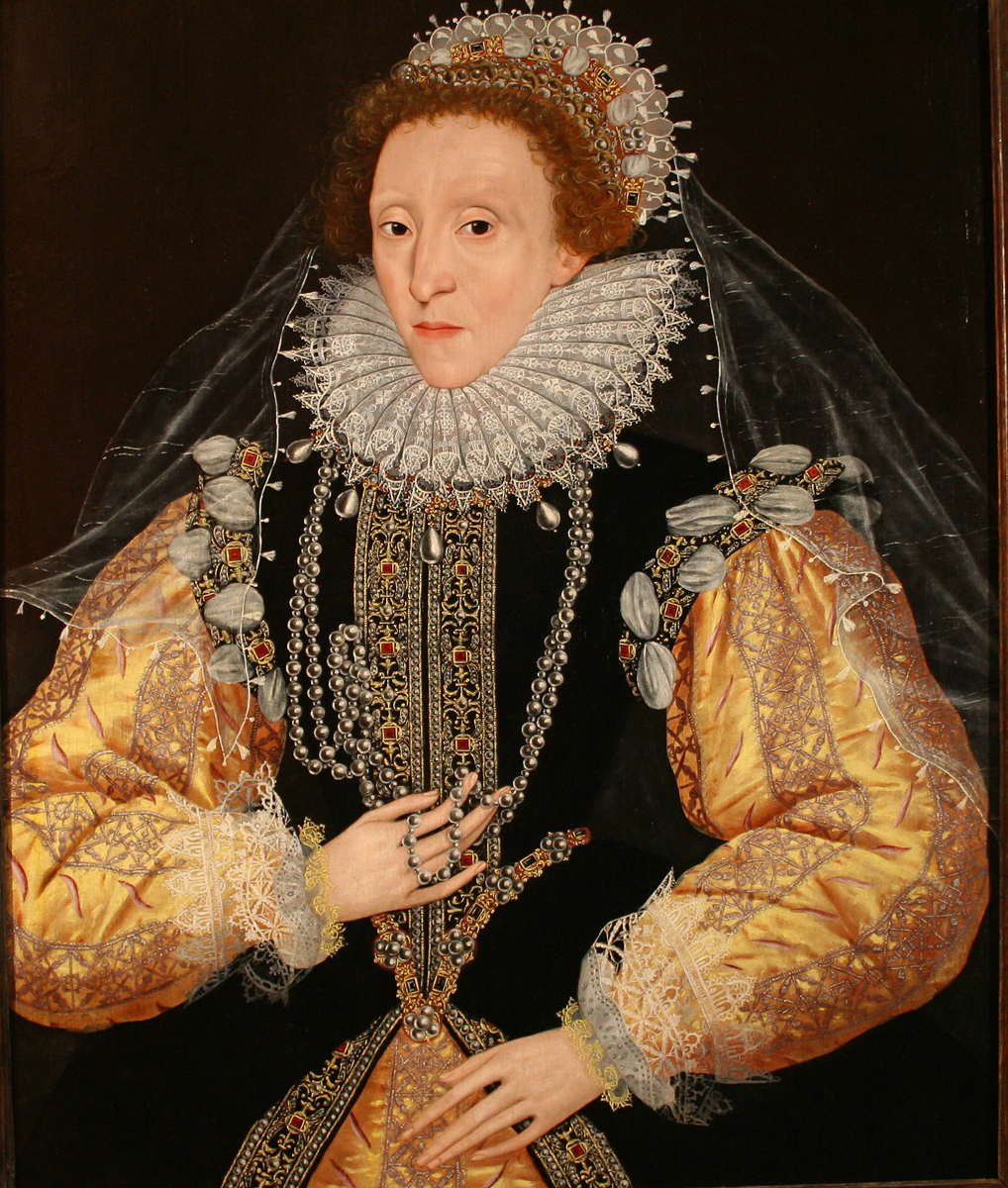
The Drewe Portrait, 1580s, George Gower

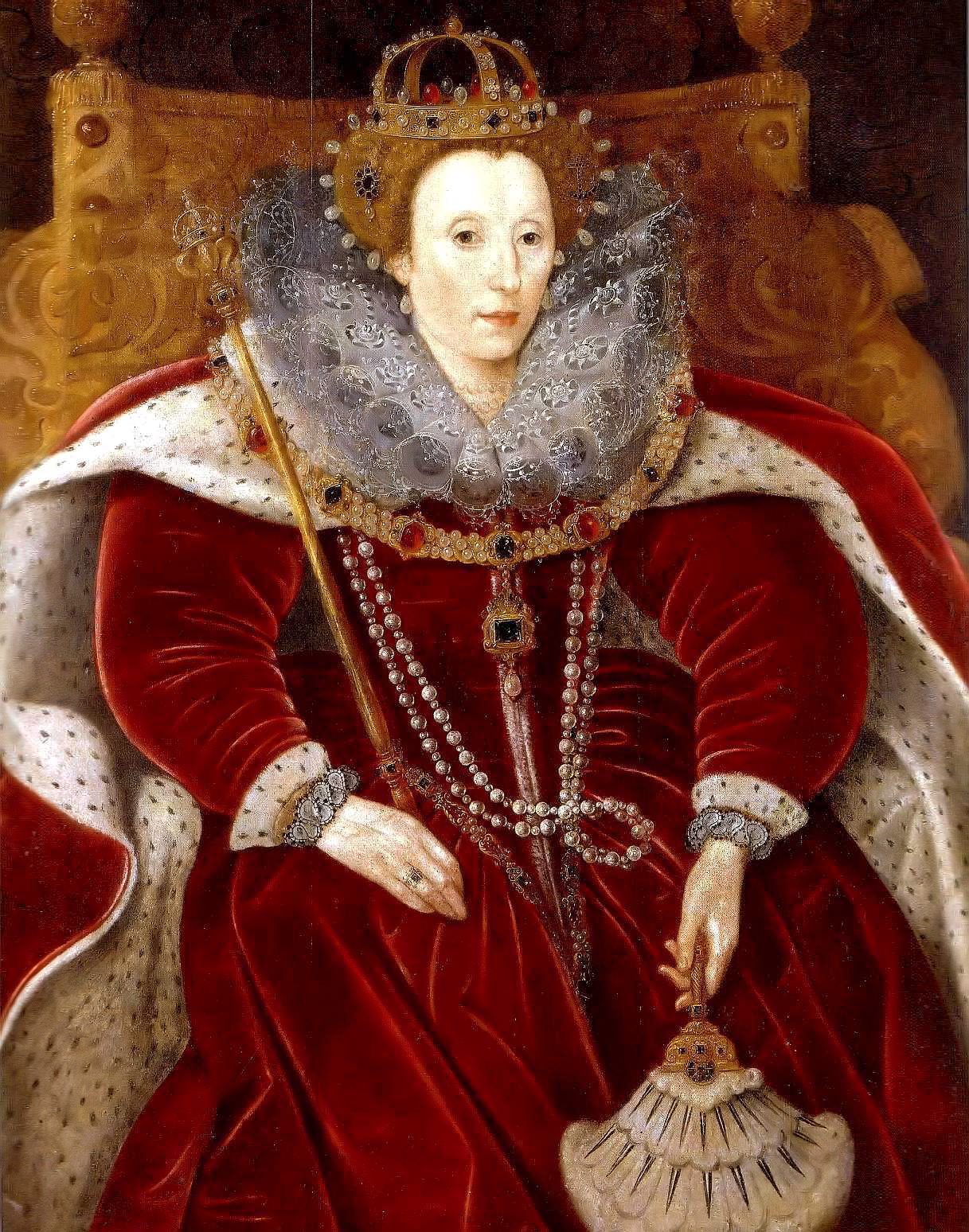
In Parliament Robes, 1585–90, attributed to Marcus Gheeraerts the Younger

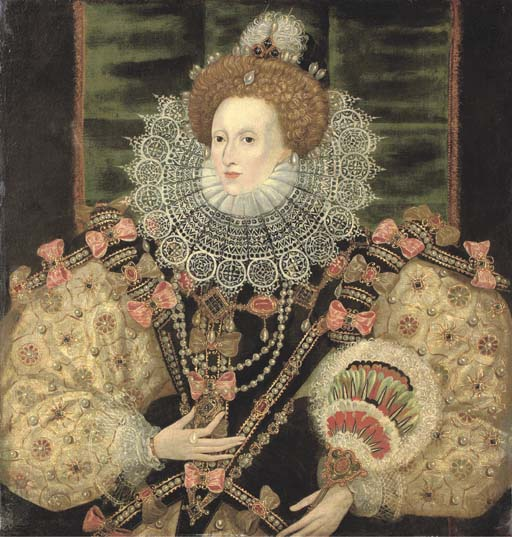
Variant of the Armada Portrait, c. 1588

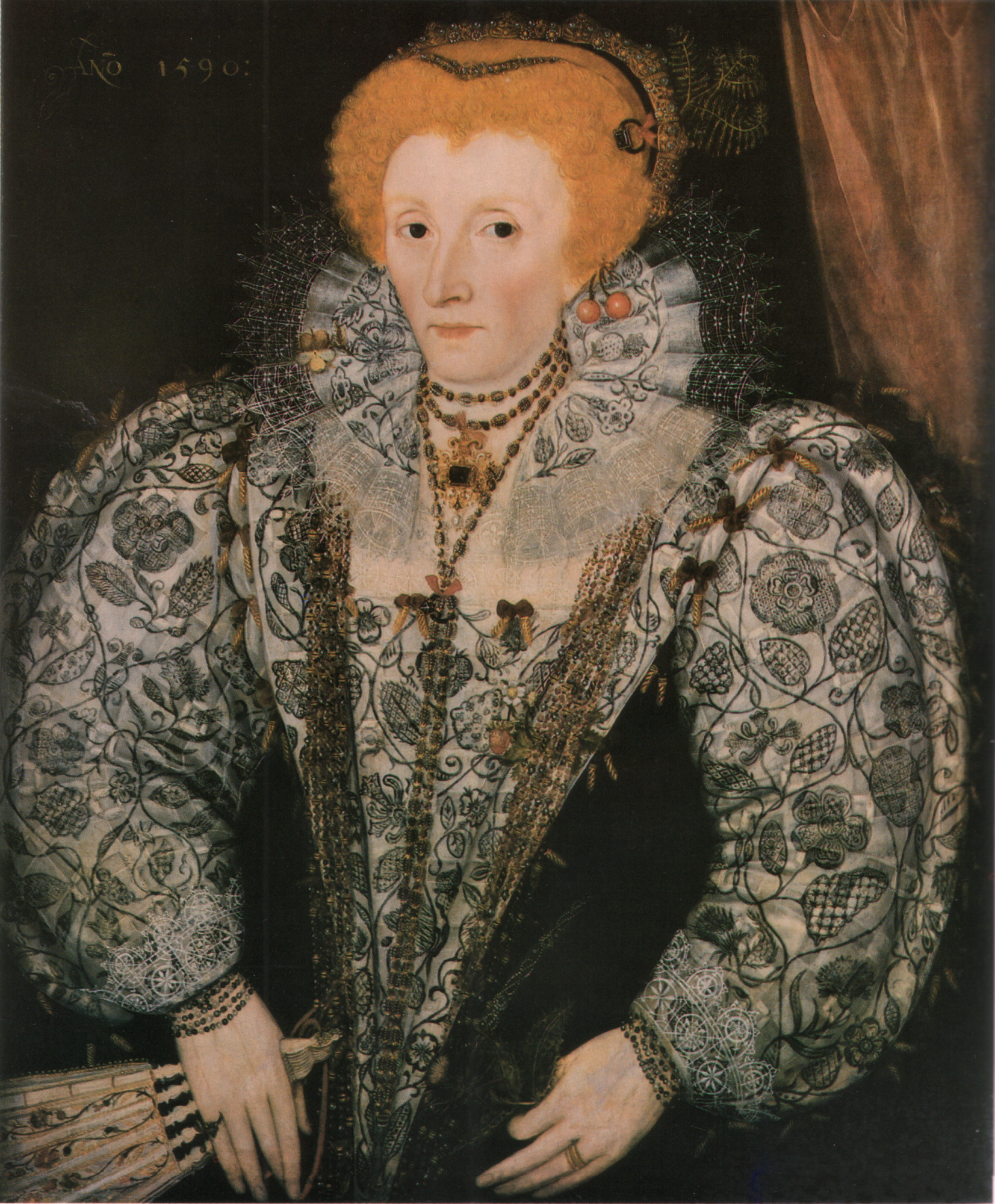
Another portrait at Jesus College, Oxford unknown artist, c. 1590

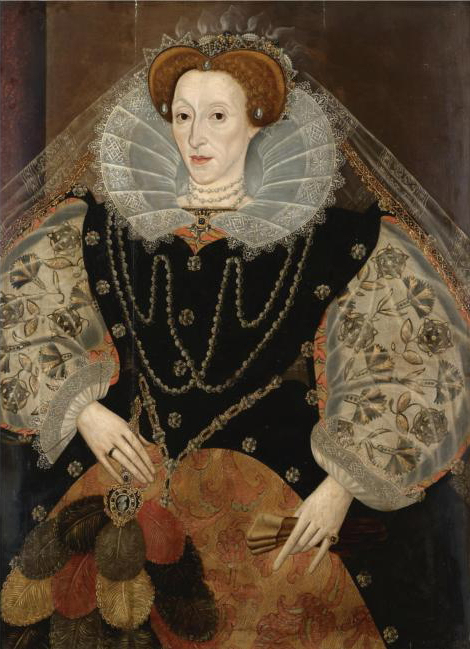
Portrait by an unknown artist, c. 1595

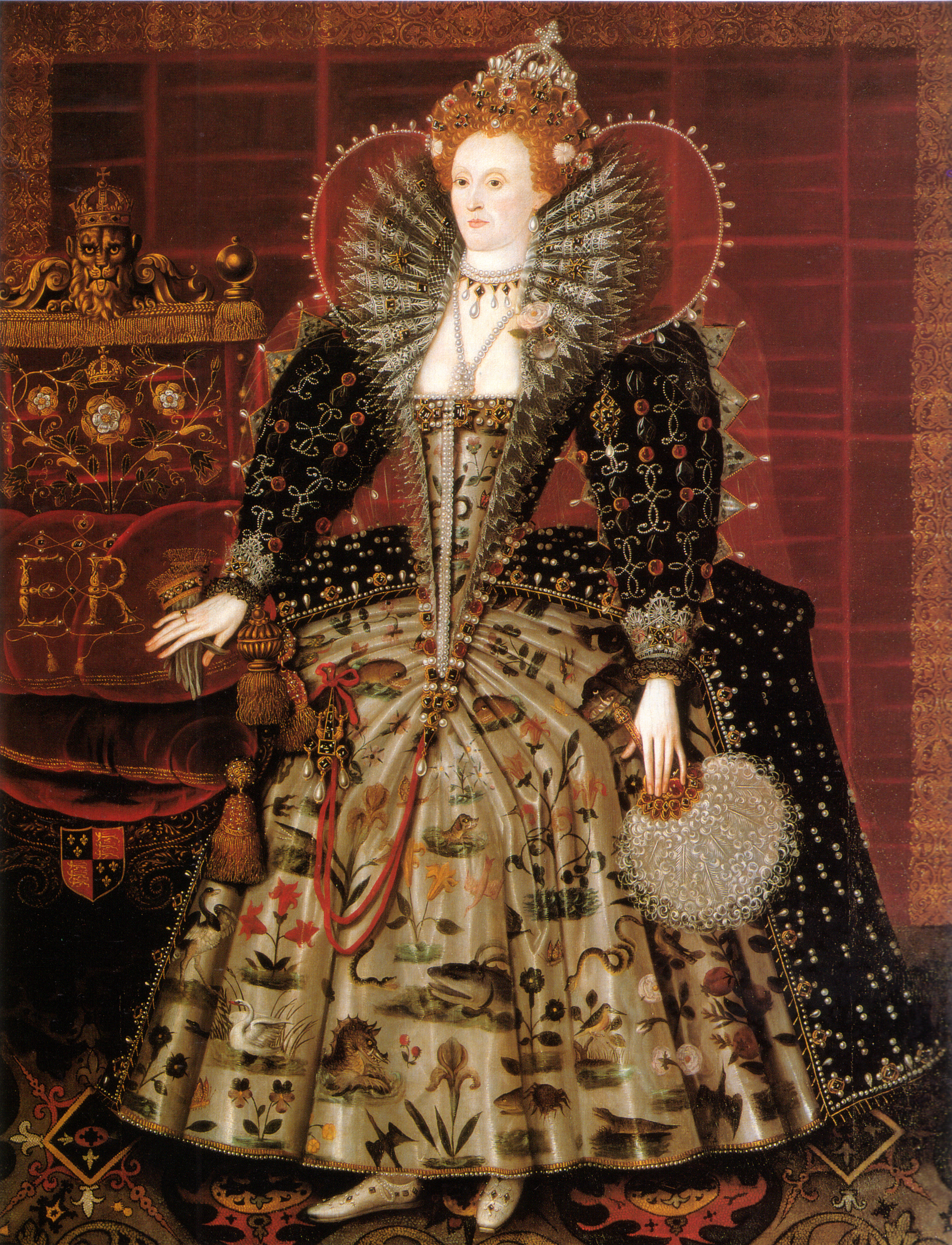
The Hardwick Hall Portrait, the Mask of Youth, Hilliard workshop, c. 1599

=== Portrait medallions and cameos ===
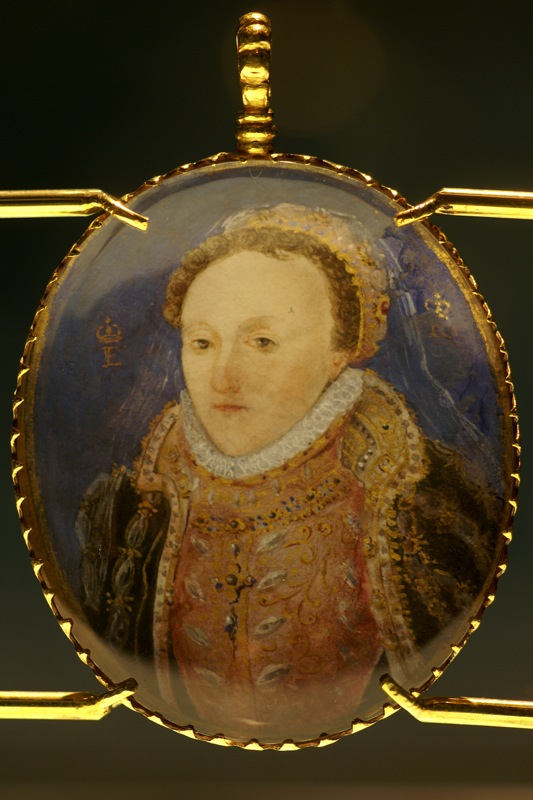
Portrait medallion, c. 1572–73, diplomatic gift to Adriaen de Manmaker, appointed Treasurer General of the province of Zeeland on 20 October 1573.

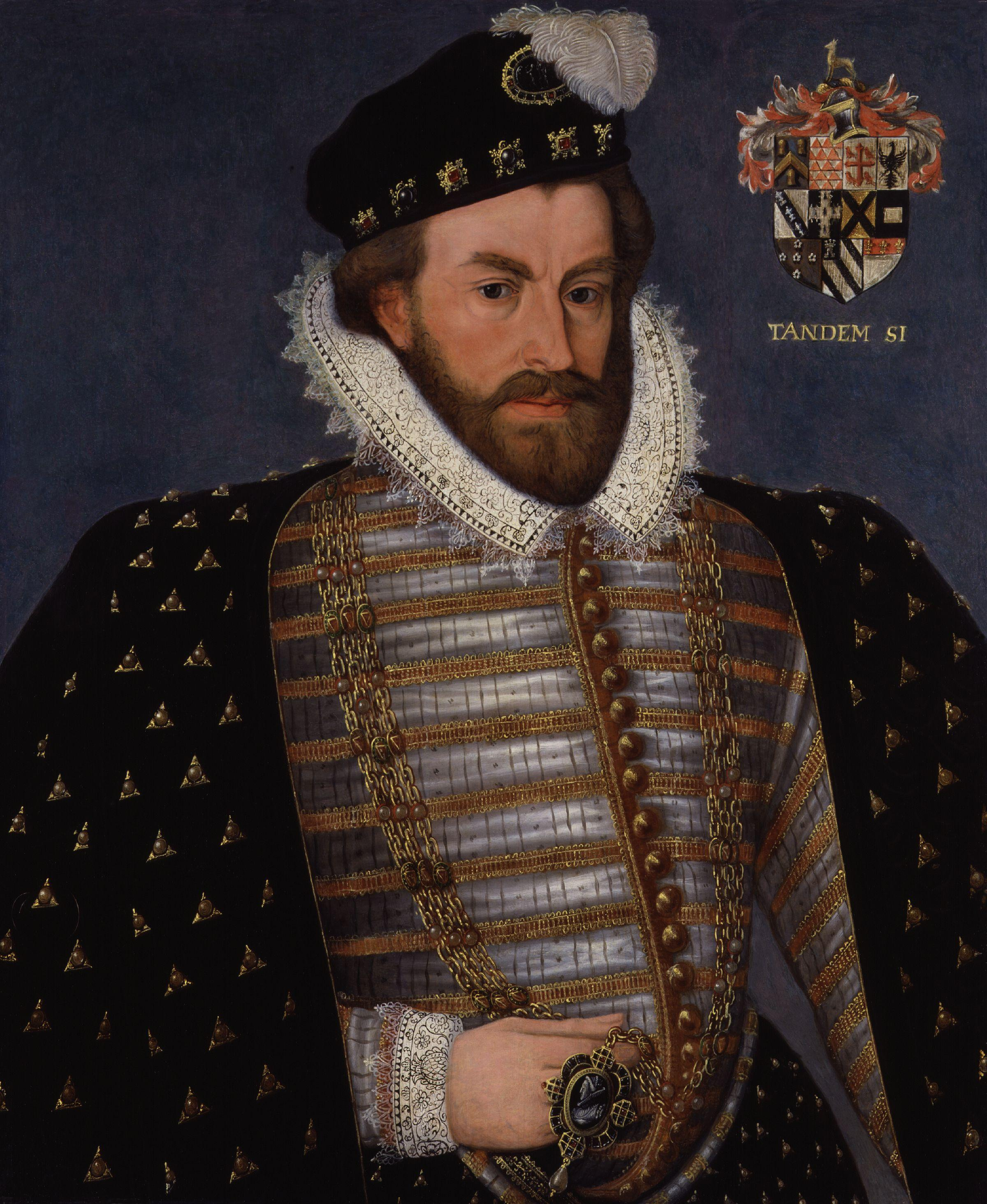
Sir Christopher Hatton wearing a cameo of the Queen, 1589, unknown artist (?after Ketel)

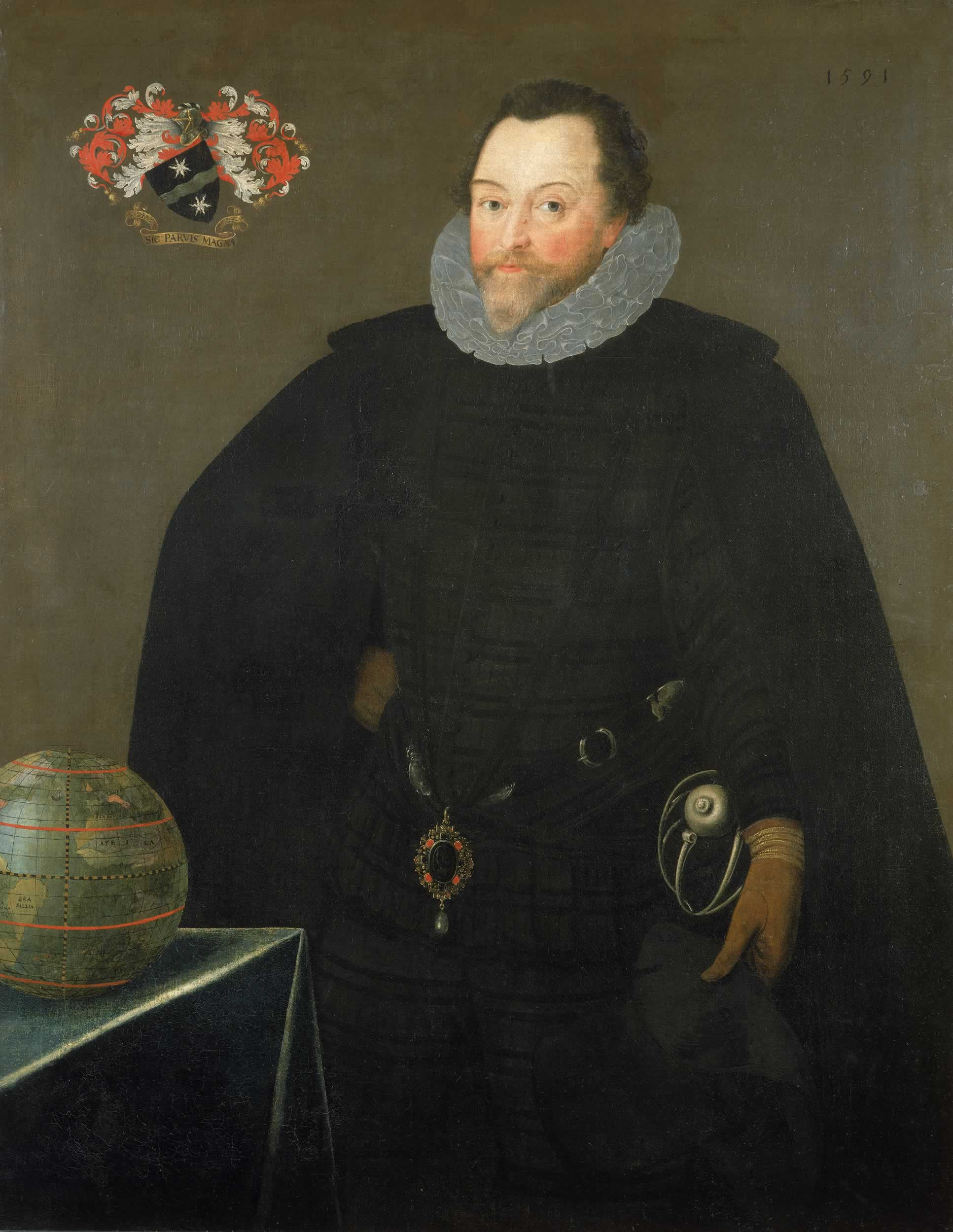
Sir Francis Drake wearing the Drake Pendant, a cameo of the Queen. Gheeraerts the Younger, 1591

=== Drawings ===
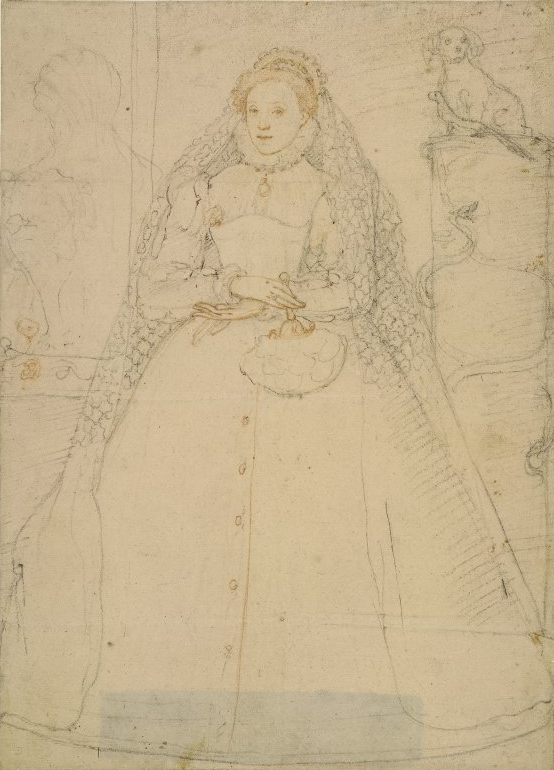
Preliminary chalk sketch for a portrait of Elizabeth I, Zuccari, c. 1575

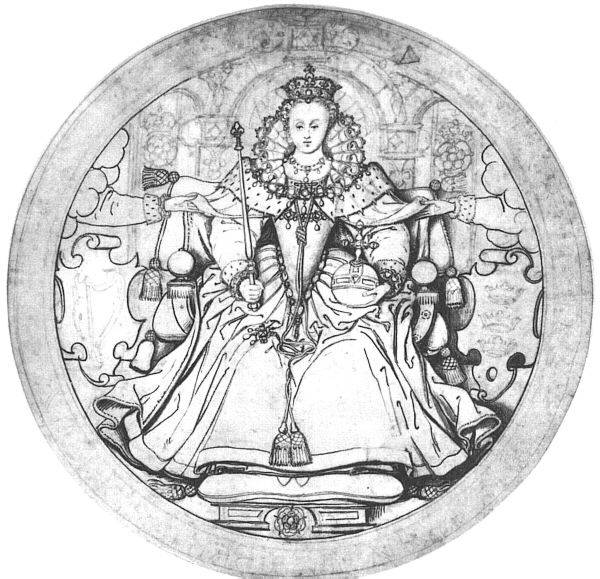
Design for the obverse of a Great Seal for Ireland (never made), pen and ink wash over pencil, Hilliard, c. 1584

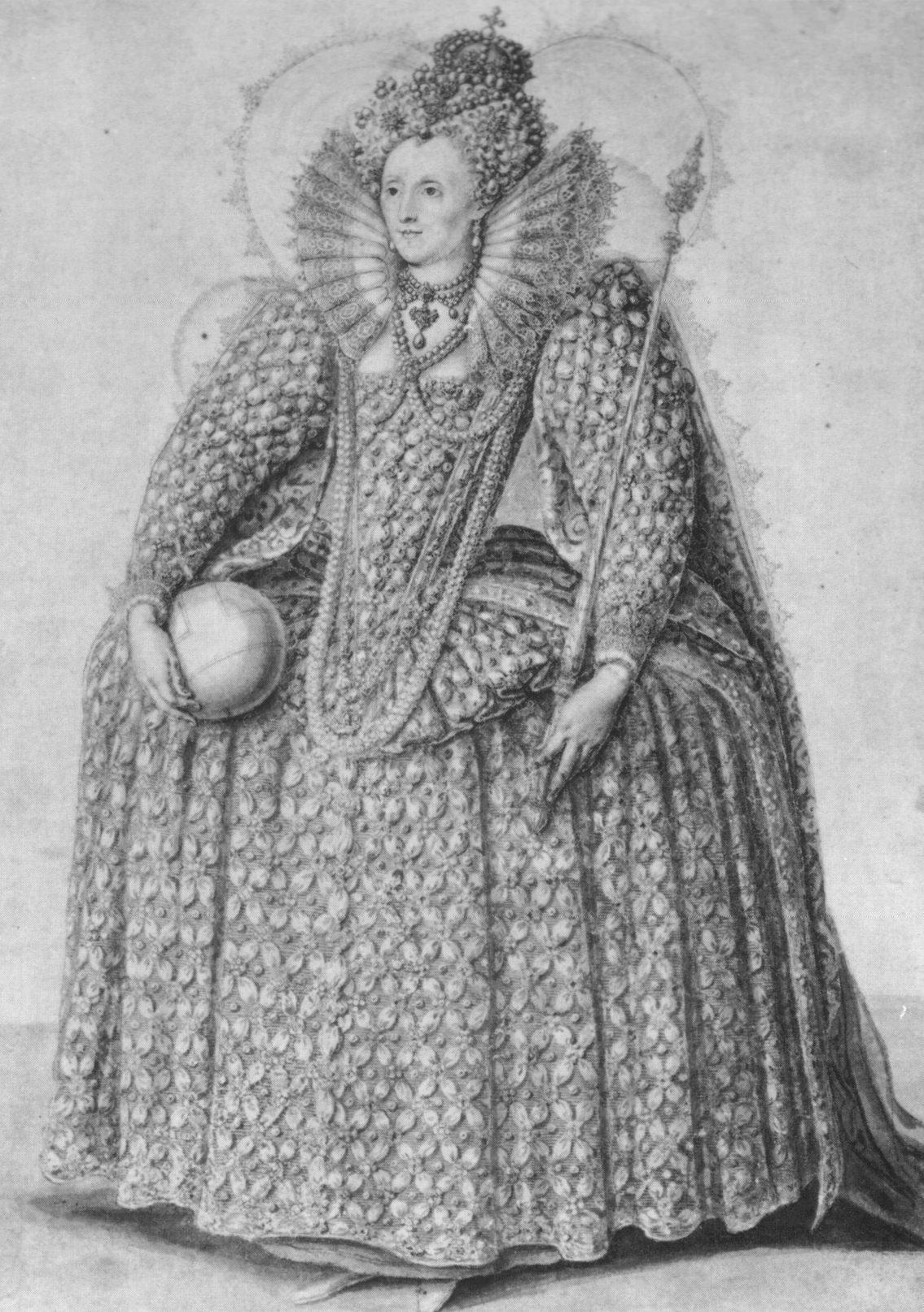
Pen and ink drawing on vellum by Isaac Oliver, c. 1592–95

=== Prints and coins ===
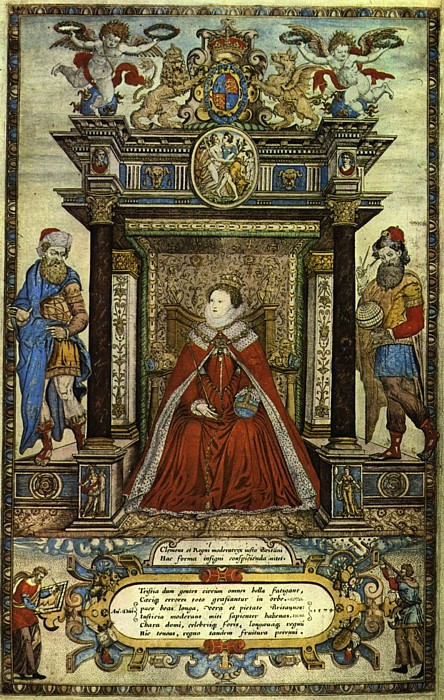
Coloured frontispiece to Christopher Saxton's Atlas of England and Wales, 1579

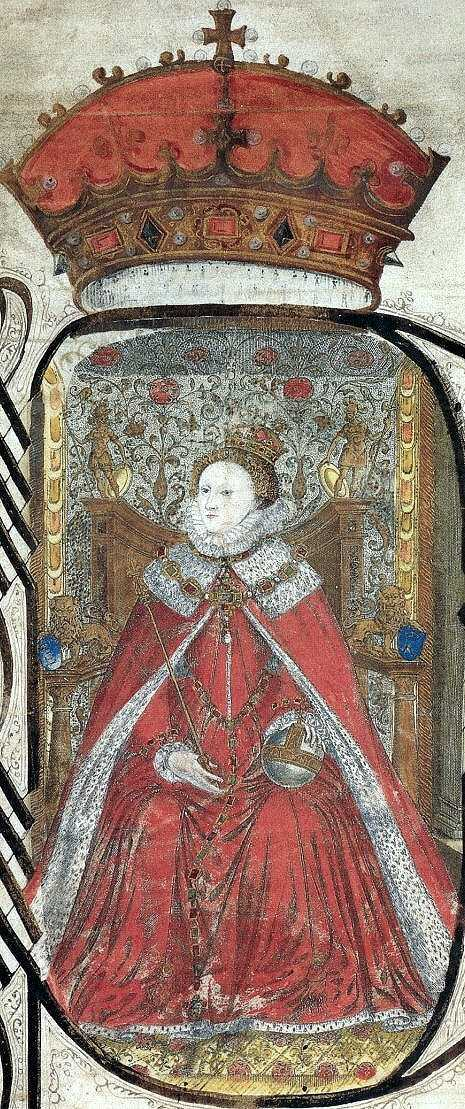
Coloured engraving, Coram Rege roll, 1581

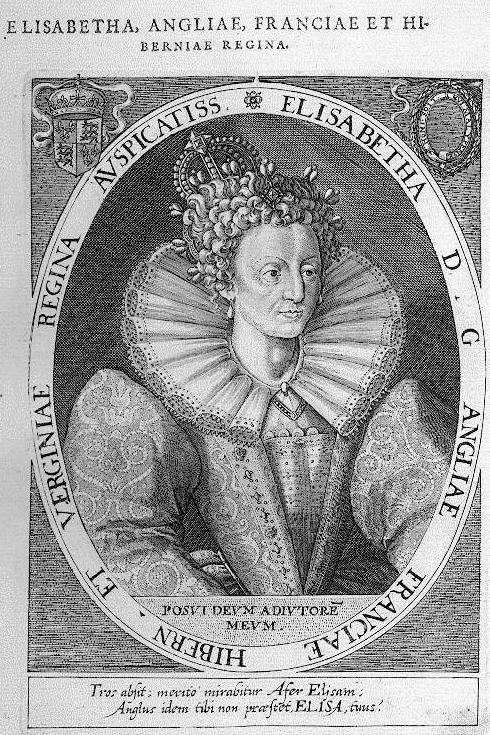
Engraving based on the Oliver pattern of c. 1592

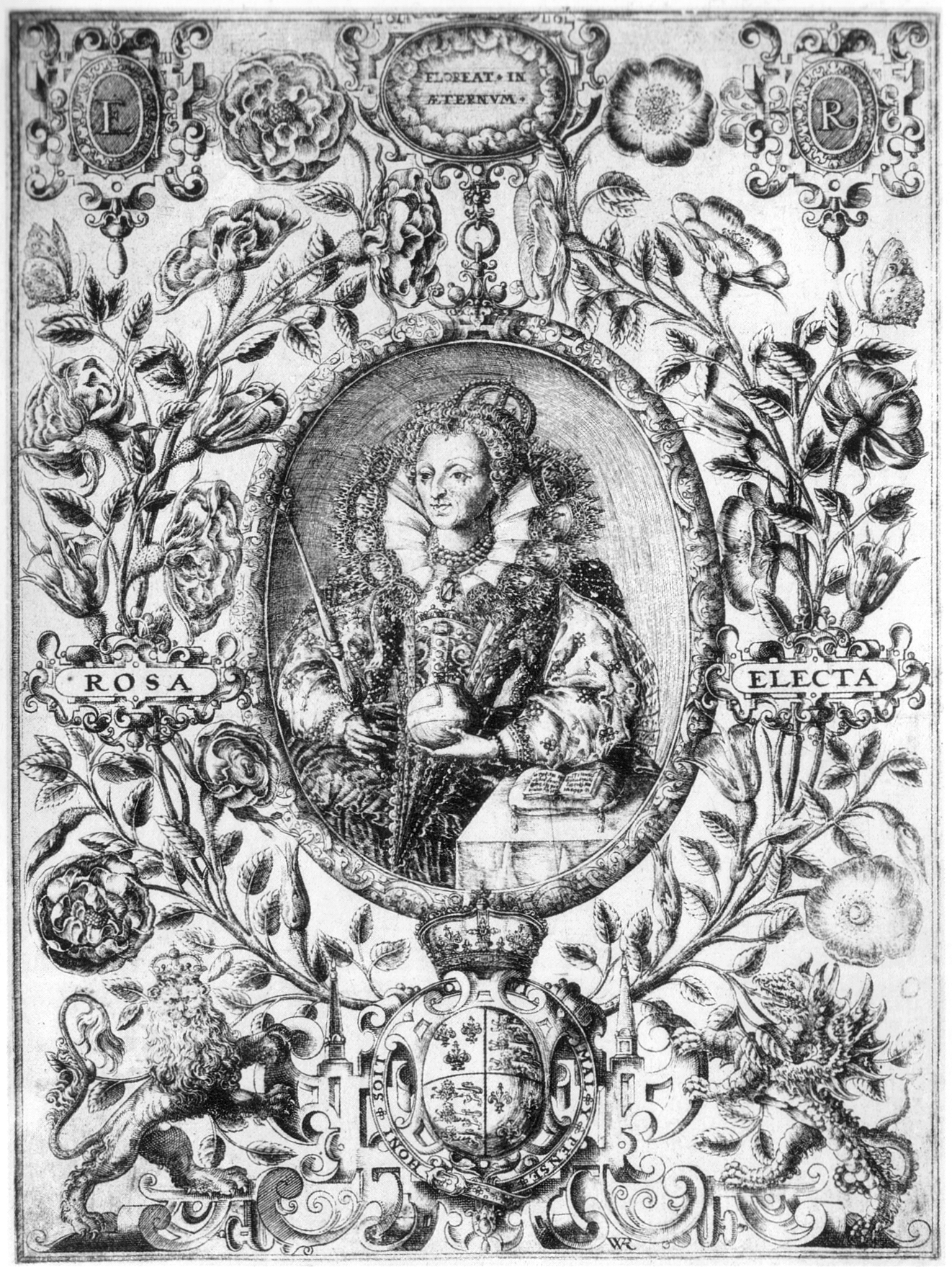
Elizabeth as Rosa Electa, Rogers, 1590–95

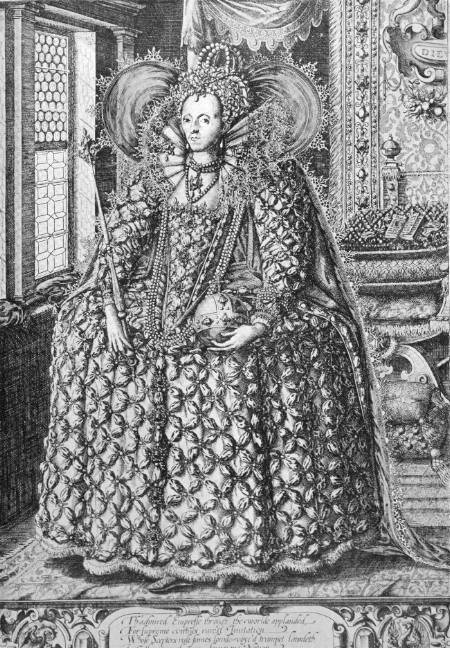
Engraving by William Rogers from the drawing by Oliver c. 1592

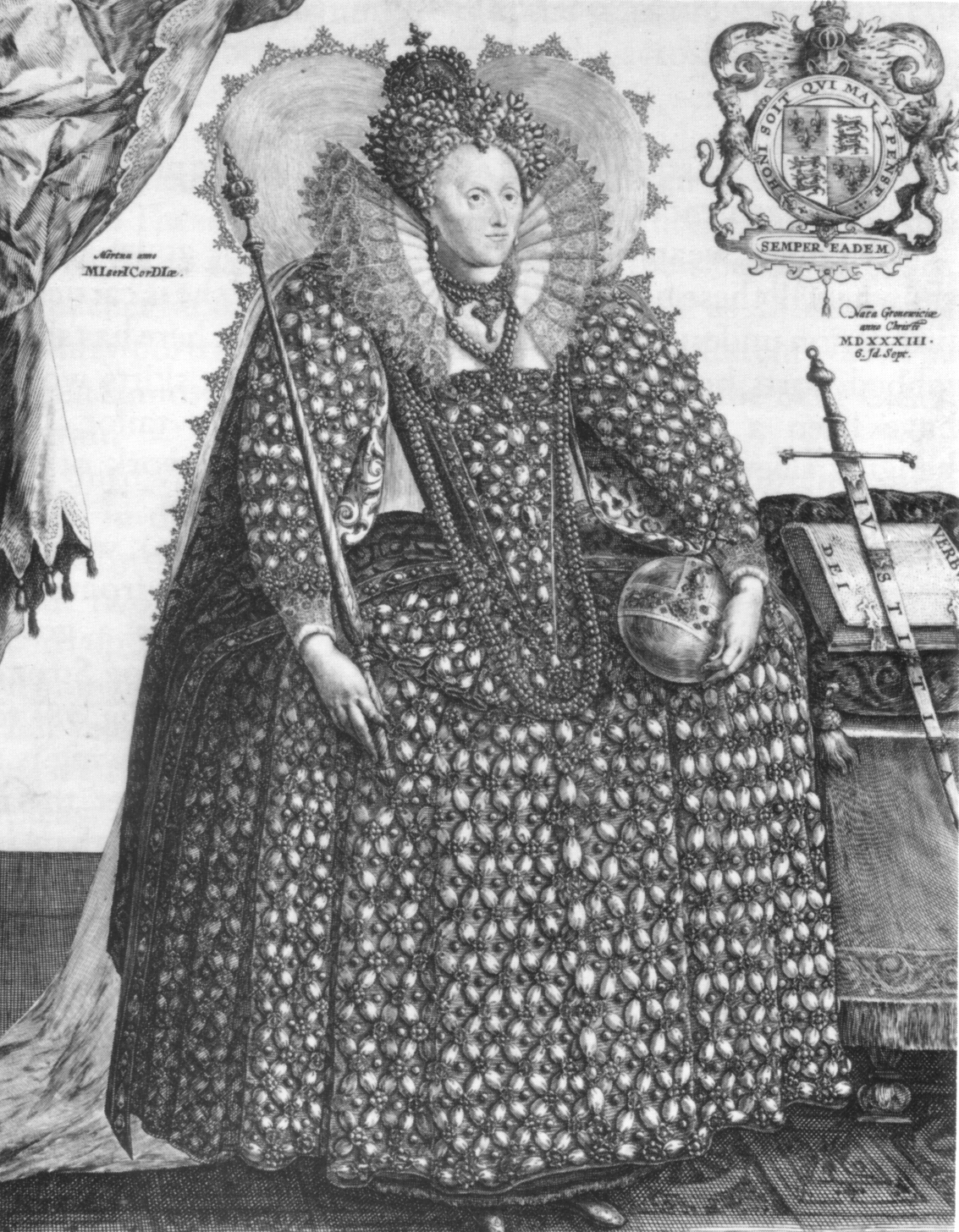
Engraving c. 1592–95 by Crispijn de Passe from the drawing by Oliver, with later inscription

Irish groat of 1561. Coins were of course the main way the mass of her people received images of Elizabeth.

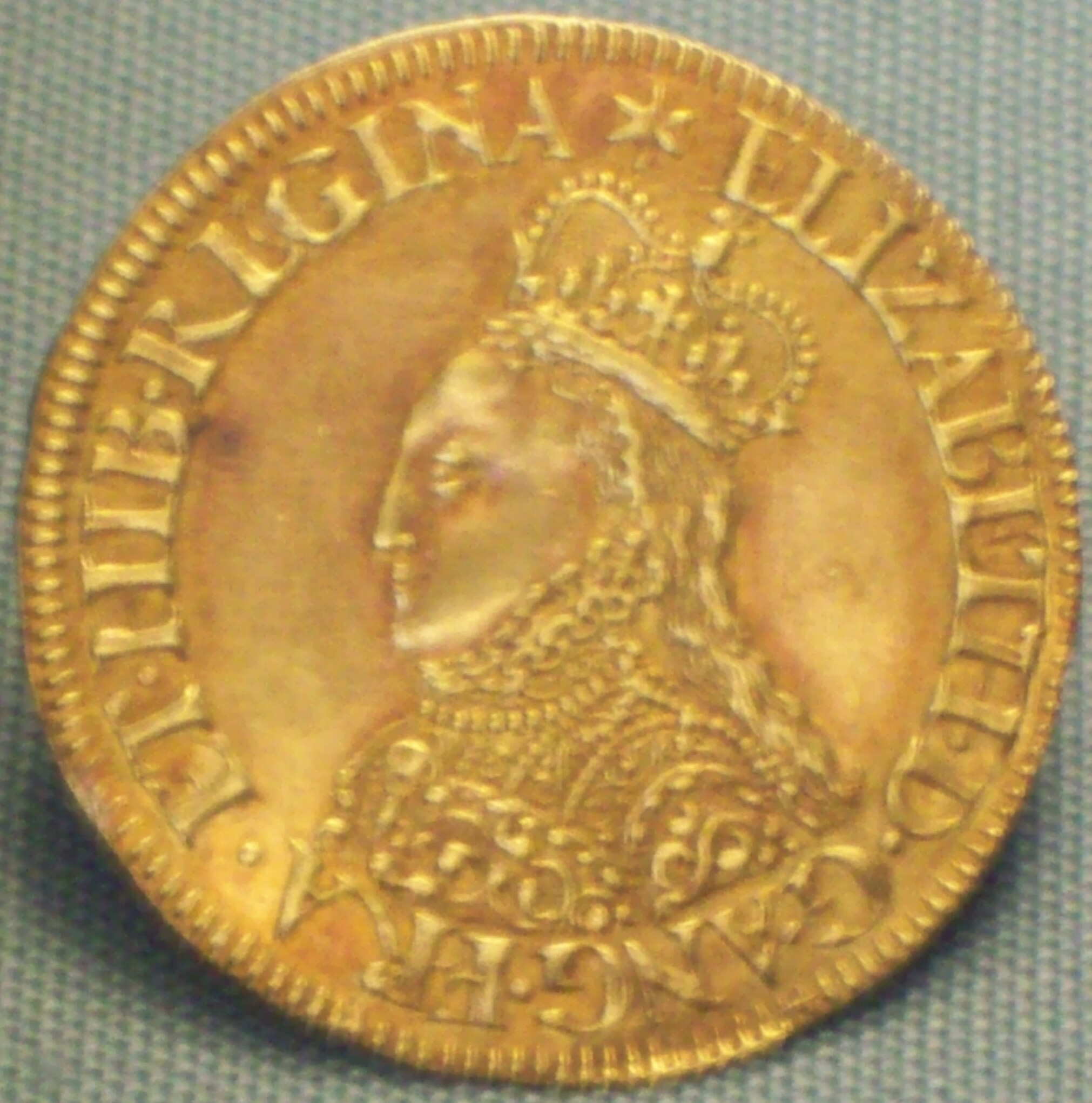
Gold half-pound of 1560–61

=== Illuminated manuscripts ===
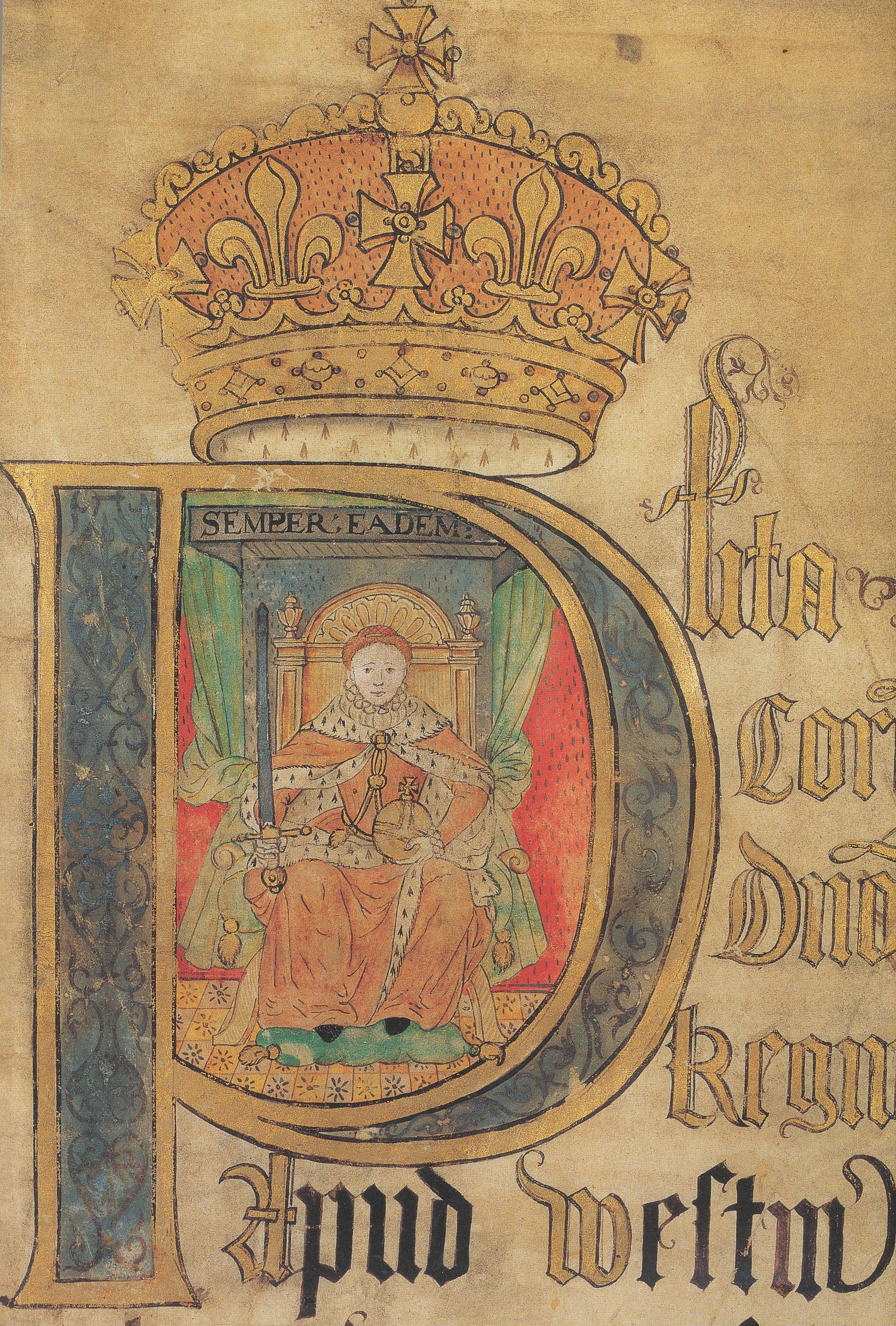
Illuminated initial membrane, Court of King's Bench: Coram Rege Roll, Easter Term, 1572

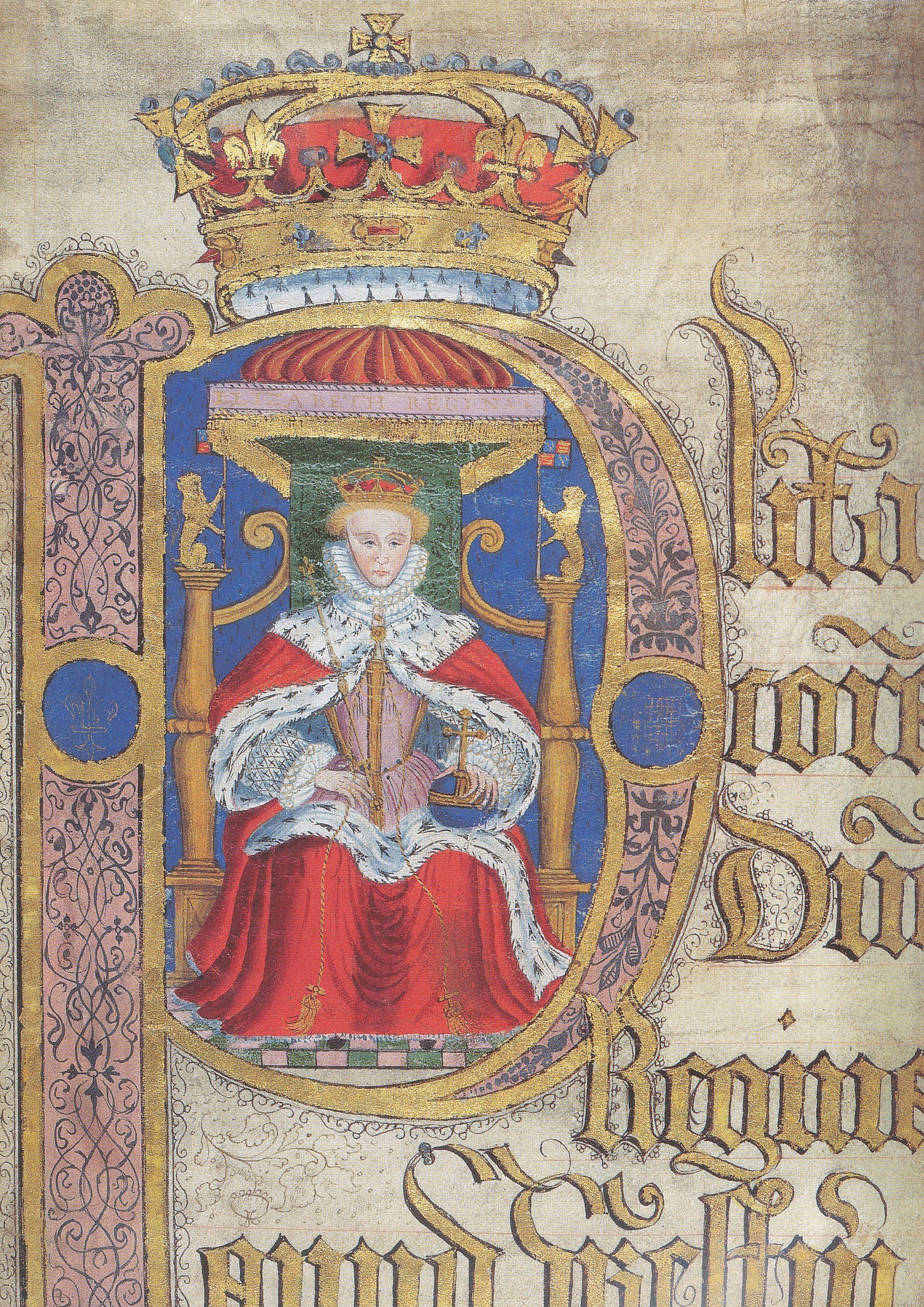
Coram Rege Roll, Easter Term, 1584

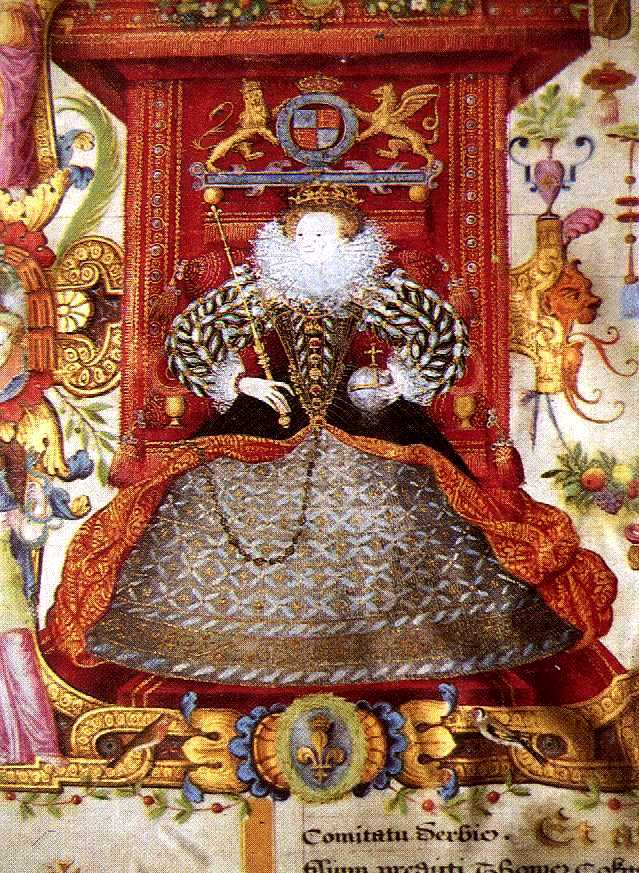
Charter of Queen Elizabeth's Grammar School, Ashbourne, Hilliard, 1585

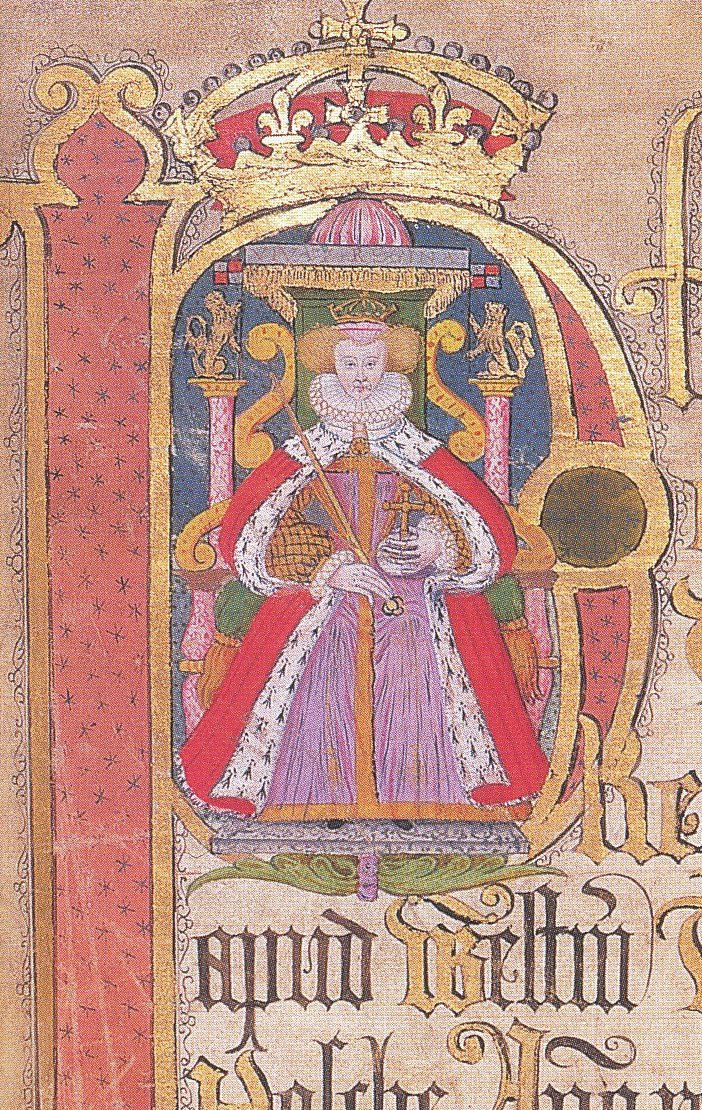
Coram Rege Roll, Easter Term, 1589

=== Postage Stamps ===
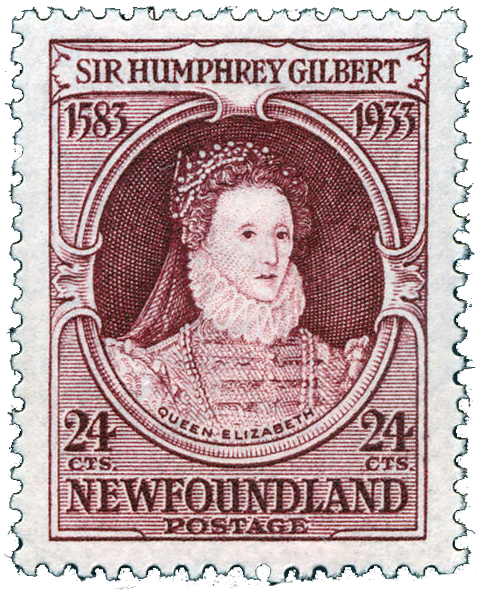
Newfoundland Stamp 224b — Queen Elizabeth I (1933) 24¢. Issued on the 350th anniversary of Sir Humphrey Gilbert’s claim, Its design is based on the Darnley Portrait.

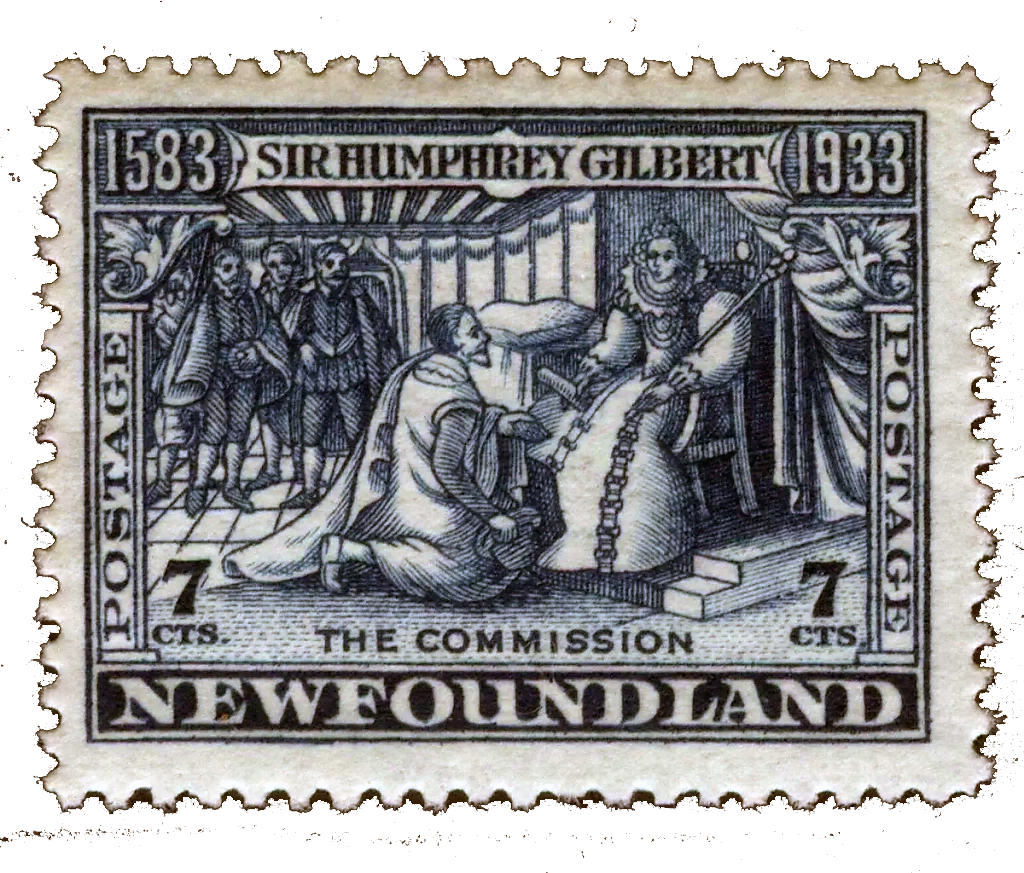
Newfoundland Stamp 217b — Queen Elizabeth I (1933) 7¢. Queen Elizabeth I granted letters patent to Sir Humphrey Gilbert, authorizing his voyage of discovery and claim to Newfoundland in 1583.

== See also ==
- 1550–1600 in fashion
- Artists of the Tudor Court
- Cultural depictions of Elizabeth I of England

== Sources ==
- Arnold, Janet: "The 'Coronation' Portrait of Queen Elizabeth I", The Burlington Magazine, CXX, 1978, pp. 727–41.
- Arnold, Janet: Queen Elizabeth's Wardrobe Unlock'd, W S Maney and Son Ltd, Leeds 1988. ISBN 0-901286-20-6
- Blunt, Anthony, Art and Architecture in France, 1500–1700, 2nd edn 1957, Penguin
- Cooper, Tarnya; Bolland, Charlotte (2014). The Real Tudors : kings and queens rediscovered. London: National Portrait Gallery. ISBN 9781855144927.
- Freedberg, Sydney J., Painting in Italy, 1500–1600, 3rd edn. 1993, Yale, ISBN 0-300-05587-0
- Gaunt, William: Court Painting in England from Tudor to Victorian Times. London: Constable, 1980. ISBN 0-09-461870-4.
- Gent, Lucy, and Nigel Llewellyn, eds: Renaissance Bodies: The Human Figure in English Culture c. 1540–1660Reaktion Books, 1990, ISBN 0-948462-08-6
- Hearn, Karen, ed. Dynasties: Painting in Tudor and Jacobean England 1530–1630. New York: Rizzoli, 1995. ISBN 0-8478-1940-X (Hearn 1995)
- Hearn, Karen: Marcus Gheeraerts II Elizabeth Artist, London: Tate Publishing 2002, ISBN 1-85437-443-5 (Hearn 2002)
- Kinney, Arthur F.: Nicholas Hilliard's "Art of Limning", Northeastern University Press, 1983, ISBN 0-930350-31-6
- Levey, Michael, Painting at Court, Weidenfeld & Nicolson, London, 1971
- Penny, Nicholas, National Gallery Catalogues (new series): The Sixteenth Century Italian Paintings, Volume 1, 2004, National Gallery Publications Ltd, ISBN 1-85709-908-7
- Museo del Prado, Catálogo de las pinturas, 1996, Ministerio de Educación y Cultura, Madrid, ISBN 84-87317-53-7 (Prado)
- Reynolds, Graham: Nicholas Hilliard & Isaac Oliver, Her Majesty's Stationery Office, 1971
- Strong, Roy: The English Icon: Elizabethan and Jacobean Portraiture, 1969, Routledge & Kegan Paul, London (Strong 1969)
- Strong, Roy: Nicholas Hilliard, 1975, Michael Joseph Ltd, London, ISBN 0-7181-1301-2 (Strong 1975)
- Strong, Roy: The Cult of Elizabeth, 1977, Thames and Hudson, London, ISBN 0-500-23263-6 (Strong 1977)
- Strong, Roy: Artists of the Tudor Court: The Portrait Miniature Rediscovered 1520–1620, Victoria & Albert Museum exhibit catalogue, 1983, ISBN 0-905209-34-6 (Strong 1983)
- Strong, Roy: Art and Power; Renaissance Festivals 1450–1650, 1984, The Boydell Press;ISBN 0-85115-200-7 (Strong 1984)
- Strong, Roy: "From Manuscript to Miniature" in John Murdoch, Jim Murrell, Patrick J. Noon & Roy Strong, The English Miniature, Yale University Press, New Haven and London, 1981 (Strong 1981)
- Strong, Roy: Gloriana: The Portraits of Queen Elizabeth I, Thames and Hudson, 1987, ISBN 0-500-25098-7 (Strong 1987)
- Strong, Roy: The Spirit of Britain, 1999, Hutchison, London, ISBN 1-85681-534-X (Strong 1999)
- Trevor-Roper, Hugh; Princes and Artists, Patronage and Ideology at Four Habsburg Courts 1517–1633, Thames & Hudson, London, 1976, ISBN 0-500-23232-6
- Waterhouse, Ellis; Painting in Britain, 1530–1790, 4th Edn, 1978, Penguin Books (now Yale History of Art series)
- Yates, Frances: Astraea: The Imperial Theme in the Sixteenth Century, London and Boston: Routledge and Kegan Paul, 1975, ISBN 0-7100-7971-0
