= Nunziata d'Antonio =

Italian painter

Nunziato d'Antonio di Domenico, known as Nunziata (1468–1525) was an Italian painter, fireworks artist, and bombardier of Renaissance Florence. None of Nunziata's works can be identified today. Most of what we know about him comes from a single passage by Giorgio Vasari, in the 1568 edition of the Vite, within the Life of Ridolfo, David, and Benedetto Ghirlandaio. Too young to have known Nunziata personally, Vasari shaped him into a literary character: the joking painter in the tradition of Franco Sacchetti's novelle about Giotto and the fabled Buffalmacco. Nunziata belonged to the class of plebeian artists, and Vasari generally omitted their works. His story represents a part of Florentine art outside Vasari's canon, that became art history. His son Antonio, also a painter, left to work in England in 1519, and as Anthony Toto became a court artist or Serjeant Painter to Henry VIII and Edward VI.

== Life ==
Nunziata's life and career are very sparsely documented. By 1499 we know that Nunziata had joined the Compagnia di San Luca, the Florentine artists’ confraternity. The artist was also listed in Compagnia's membership book of 1503-5, the so-called Libro rosso. In 1515 he was paid for painting a cross in SS. Annunziata, in preparation for the consecration of the church by Leo X. A notarial document of 1507 names him as a member of another confraternity, the Compagnia di San Girolamo, called il Ciottolino, which met ‘below the church of Santa Maria sopr’Arno’. In 1512, the deliberations of the Florentine Signoria reveal that Nunziata and his friend Ridolfo Ghirlandaio were then working—alongside the painters Francesco di Niccolò Dolzemele, Jacopo di Francesco di Domenico, Bastiano di Bartolomeo Mazzanti, and Piero di Giorgio—on the decoration of the Palazzo Vecchio. Nunziata was paid in August of that year for painting nine coats of arms on the new windows that looked out over the dogana or customs office.

The anomaly of Nunziata's place in the history of art begins with his name—styled after none other than the Annunciate Virgin Mary. It was a name exceedingly rare in fifteenth-century Florence, whether in its male or female form. Indeed, the only other Florentine known to have received it during the fifteenth century was a foundling baptized in 1470—but significantly, even in this case her given name was ‘Onesta’, and she received ‘Nunziata’ only as her baptismal name (which would never be used again after the baptismal ceremony). In documents, the painter's name appears in both the feminine version cited by Vasari and in the masculine form, Nunziato. It is the latter that appears in the newly discovered record of the artist's birth and baptism, which dates from 22 October 1468. Until now Nunziata's birthdate was erroneously given in the literature as 1475.

A document of 1517 names Nunziata and his son Toto as witnesses to the will of a legnaiuolo named Giuseppe di Lorenzo in the parish of San Pancrazio in September 1517. Surprisingly, here Nunziata is identified not as a painter but as a bombardier (‘Nunziato Antonii Dominici bombardiere’). Apparently as an old man, he must have fallen upon hard times. It was common for out-of-work craftsmen to moonlight as bombardiers (well-known examples include Raffaello da Montelupo and Zanobi Lastricati), though it was generally the province of masters in the more physically demanding arts, such as cannon-founders, sculptors, and scalpellini. Nunziata is a rare, if not unique example of a Renaissance painter working as a bombardier. In all likelihood, the skills of mixing and manipulating gunpowder to create his fuochi d’artificio turned out to be easily transferable to the job of an artilleryman when there was not enough painting work to stave the wolf from the door.

On 28 September 1519 Nunziata personally came forward to give his blessing as his son Antonio, called Toto del Nunziata, contracted to work abroad with Pietro Torrigiani for four and a half years. Prior to this time, Vasari relates that Toto had worked in the shop of Nunziata's friend Ridolfo Ghirlandaio where he had painted a number of pictures that were sent to England (just as his fellow studio assistant Bartolomeo Ghetti is said to have made paintings that were sent to King Francis I of France before he himself departed for the French court). At the time Toto signed on with Torrigiani, he was several months past his twenty-first birthday; technically, therefore, his father's permission was not required for the contract. Nunziata may have wished to give his formal assent in order to ensure that there would be no qualms about the legitimacy of Toto's contract. On the other hand, his recollection of his son Toto's exact age may merely have been a bit shaky.

The painting business must have been looking up by 1521, just as Nunziata's personal affairs were hitting the rocks. In July of that year, a decree of the Florentine criminal court of the Otto di Guardia e Balìa again refers to him as ‘pictor’ in a judgment by which they condemned him to pay a four-florin fine to the magistracy, to hand over two florins to a certain Andrea di Biagio, and to satisfy an unspecified debt to Andrea's son Biagio. The substantial fine that the artist was sentenced to pay to the court (in addition to what he owed the plaintiffs) implies that Nunziata was also being punished for some kind of misdeed, though its nature is not made clear by the magistrates’ decree.

== Vasari's account ==
Vasari described Nunziata as a ‘dipintore di fantocci’. Literally, this means a painter of dolls or puppets, and it is in just such a literal sense that scholars have generally interpreted Vasari's epithet. Yet such an interpretation overlooks several important problems. First, there was no special profession of doll-painter or puppet-painter per se in Renaissance Italy. It is hardly a coincidence that the great myths and fables about professional toymakers—from the Brothers Grimm to Collodi—all belong to the nineteenth century.

Further evidence that Vasari meant the phrase ‘dipintore di fantocci’ in a metaphorical sense comes from the context in which he uses the word fantoccio elsewhere in the Lives. On nearly every other occasion in which the word fantoccio or one of its cognates appears in the Lives, Vasari uses it as a term of deprecation to signify a crudely sketched figure, a daub, a work reminiscent of a child's doodles. Thus Vasari uses the term fantoccio to describes Tribolo’s selection to replace the earlier, inept designers of the Florentine fireworks displays (girandole) for the feast of San Giovanni as: ‘certi fantocciai, che avevano già molt’anni fatto…mille gofferie’. He uses the term fantoccio to describe the crude graffiti figures scratched on walls by vandals: ‘una figura che non avessi niente di disegno…goffa, simile a que’ fantocci che fanno coloro che non sanno et imbrattano le mura’. Thus, as Vasari applies the term to Nunziata, ‘pittore di fantocci’ can be considered somewhere on a par with (or below) the writer’s other categories of unskilled or plebeian painters: the despised ‘pittore ordinario,’ such as the painters of ceri (candles), ‘che stanno a bottega aperta publicamente a lavorare ogni cosa meccanica’. In fact, Vasari says that candle painters were so widely known for their crude handiwork ‘che hanno dato il nome ai dipintori plebei (onde si dice alle cattive pitture “fantocci da ceri”)’. But the term could also be applied dismissively to the artistic productions of the Middle Ages: ‘quei fantocci e quelle goffezze che nelle cose vecchie ancora oggi appariscono’.

‘Se bene era dipintore di fantocci’, however, Vasari could still appreciate two things in which Nunziata was a ‘persona rara’. The first was his skill in making the fireworks, and especially the girandole for San Giovanni (evidently he was much more talented in this line than the unnamed girandola-makers succeeding him, whom Vasari disparages as ‘fantocciai’). The other remarkable quality Nunziata possessed, according to the biographer, was his gift of infinite jest, which rendered his company and conversation agreeable to all. Thus Nunziata belongs to that other taxonomy of artists in the Lives such as Bugiardini and Jacopo Indaco who, though dismissed by Vasari as negligible artists, are nonetheless celebrated as burlevoli and faceti.

== Anecdotes ==
Vasari's two anecdotes about Nunziata's burle are very well known.

In the first, he tells of a Florentine patron who allegedly ordered Nunziata to paint a Crucifixion for the summer apartments on the camera terrena of his house. The customer was so stupid and inarticulate that he expressed his desire with the ambiguous request for ‘a Crucifixion for the summer’ (un Crucifisso per la state). Playing his client for the ignorant fool that he was, Nunziata painted the crucified Christ seasonably dressed in calzoni, or short, loose-fitting breeches.

Another patron, disgusted by artists who seemed capable only of making pictures that were inducements to lust (cose lascive), asked Nunziata to paint him a Madonna who was honourable, visibly old, and not of the sort to incite impure thoughts. In response, Nunziata painted a Madonna with a beard—flouting his patron's excessive religious scruples with a satire that dangerously crossed the line of what many contemporaries would have considered blasphemous.

These stories are tropes about the mischievous artist such as are found in Trecento writers, Sacchetti and Boccaccio. Paul Barolsky has dismissed them as invented. It is certainly true that the anecdote of the bearded Madonna, in particular, has much in common with a story told about the thirteenth-century painter Cimabue by Vasari's Florentine contemporary, Anton Francesco Grazzini, known as Il Lasca. By the mid-sixteenth century, Cimabue had come to be popularly identified as a crude and inept painter, supposedly blind from birth or with such visual impairment that his eyes could be described as ‘lined with cloth’ (‘fodrati di panno’). In Lasca's Comento sopra il Capitolo della salciccia, the author relates that once when Cimabue painted Mary Magdalen in the desert, he decided to give her a beard in order to make her look particularly old and haggard. The unexpected result, however, was that Cimabue's Magdalen was mistaken by all who saw her for St. Onofrio, an ascetic saint usually clad in nothing other than his flowing beard. In Lasca's anecdote the painter's daring iconographic innovation, instead of shocking viewers as Nunziata's Madonna would have, simply leads them to an iconographic misstep—“rectifying” the anomalous iconography of the Magdalen as a bearded old hag by confusing it with the quite canonical iconography of a male hermit saint.

Lasca follows his story about Cimabue with another humorous anecdote about Nunziata, which has been completely overlooked in the literature on the painter. After describing Cimabue's bizarre image, he continues:

Il simigliante fece ancora il Nuntiata, perciò che, havendo fatto un Tubbia, in scambio del pesce li dipinse in mano un catellino francesco.

Instead of carrying the fish whose entrails would heal his father, Tobias in Nunziata's painting carried a little French dog of a type that had been fashionable in Florence since the fourteenth century! In Lasca's anecdote, unlike Vasari's, the joke does not hinge on Sacchetti-like mockery of an ignorant layman; the point of the story is the artist's playfulness, embracing the absurd by dreaming up unexpected juxtapositions of iconographic elements.

== Painted by Ghirlandaio? ==
A record of his physical appearance may have been left to us by his friend Ridolfo Ghirlandaio. According to the Lives, Ridolfo included a portrait of Nunziata among the supernumeraries in his altarpiece of Christ Carrying the Cross, which was painted for the church of S. Gallo outside the walls of Florence, possibly c. 1505-10. The work won Ridolfo great renown, Vasari continues, on account of the lifelike portraits it contained of three painters who were his friends: Poggino Poggini, Giovanni d’Anton Francesco Guidi (called Scheggia), and Nunziata. Most of the heads in the Christ Carrying the Cross are in fact stock types or borrowings from earlier works of art, such as the helmeted soldier at the centre of the composition whose screaming face betrays the inspiration of Leonardo’s Battle of Anghiari. In stark contrast with this gallery of conventionalized characters are three extremely lifelike heads, which we can undoubtedly identify as the three portraits identified by Vasari: the soldier who shoulders his musket at the left side of the composition; the man helping Christ to bear the cross in the middle; and the stubbly grey-haired man, wearing a broad-brimmed rustic hat, entering the scene from the far right. All three have extremely particularized features, leaving little room for doubt that they were drawn from life. Vasari singles out the likeness of Nunziata for particular praise, calling it ‘una testa vivissima’. But, even positing that Vasari was correct in identifying the three individuals as Poggini, Scheggia, and Nunziata, there is no sure way to match the three painters with their individual likenesses.

== Death ==
The date of Nunziata’s death, known to the nineteenth-century archivist Gaetano Milanesi (who did not cite a specific documentary source for his information), has now been confirmed by the record of his burial, which took place in Santa Trinita (the church of the parish in which he had been born) on 13 April 1525. The choice of the Vallombrosan convent church for the painter’s burial church was likely influenced by the fact that Nunziata had been a parishioner of S. Trinita from the time of his birth in that parish until the very end of his life.

== Family ==
The Florentine baptismal records also make it possible to establish the correct birthdate of Nunziata’s son, the painter Toto del Nunziata, who was born on 8 January 1498 (modern style), as claimed by Milanesi, and not on 18 January 1499 as stated by Colnaghi and subsequent writers following him. A third child of Nunziata’s, a daughter named Lisabetta, was born on the feast of the santo patrono John the Baptist in 1499, while two other sons are mentioned as living in Nunziata’s house shortly after the painter’s death in 1525; but Toto is the only member of the family who is known to have continued in the professional footsteps of their father.

The census of Florentine men available to bear arms, drawn up some in 1527, identifies Nunziata’s former home as less than a block away from Santa Trinita, in the via del Parione that runs along the church’s northern flank. Still living there at the time of the census were two other sons of Nunziata, whose identities have not emerged from the Florentine baptismal records, together with ‘un garzone e un factore’. Neither of those two sons can be identified with Toto del Nunziata, for it appears that Toto never came back to the house in via del Parione. Instead, after embarking for England together with Torrigiani around 1519, he remained on Albion’s shore until his death twenty-five years later. Known amongst the English as Anthony Toto--or by a myriad of anglicized variants such as Totto, or Tote, or Tottes—the expatriate painter prospered at the royal courts of Henry VIII and Edward VI, where he held the lucrative office of serjeant painter from 1544 until his death in 1554. Toto presented the English kings with several paintings as New Year’s gifts, but it appears from the documentary record that much of his activity in England consisted of heraldic and decorative paintings of the sort familiar from his father’s practice. Still, if Henry and Edward underutilized Toto’s talents, they compensated him richly for them. When he died Toto left substantial property, including two cottages at Mitcham and the lease of the manor of Ravesbury. Compared to his father, who once had to struggle for a living by moonlighting as an artilleryman, Toto achieved a remarkable level of social and economic status.

== Bibliography ==
- Vasari, Giorgio; Le vite de’ più eccellenti pittori, scultori e architettori nelle redazioni del 1550 e 1568, eds. Rosanna Bettarini and Paola Barocchi, 6 vols., Florence, 1966–87, V, p. 439.
- Waldman, Louis A.; “‘Se bene era dipintore di fantocci...’: Nunziata d’Antonio, Painter, Pyrotechnician and Bombardier of Florence," Paragone (in press).
