= Domenico Puligo =

Italian painter

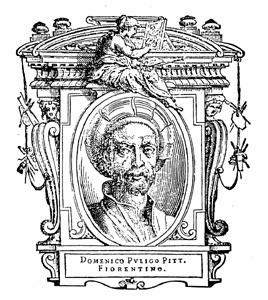
Portrait of Domenico Puligo, illustration from "Le Vite" by Giorgio Vasari. 1568.

Domenico Puligo (1492–1527) was an Italian painter of the Renaissance, active in Florence. His real name was Domenico di Bartolomeo Ubaldini.

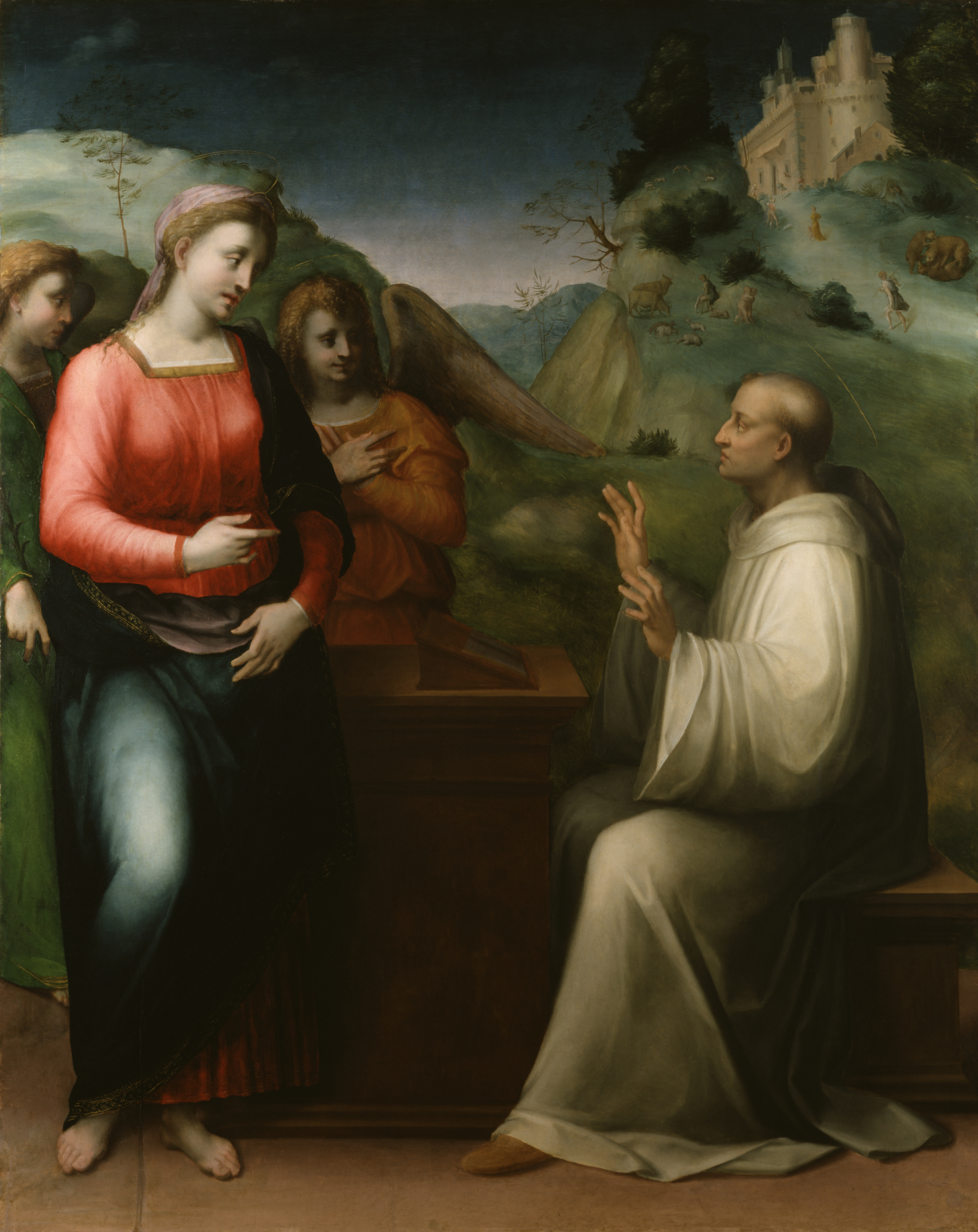
The Vision of St. Bernard. Oil on Panel. 1520. Walters Art Museum.

He trained under Ridolfo Ghirlandaio and acted as an assistant to Andrea del Sarto, whom he also became close friends with. Both Ghirlandaio and Sarto exerted heavy influences over Puligo that are evident in his works and style of painting. Puglio was also influenced by Jacopo Pontormo and Il Rosso. He rose to success as a portrait artist and was in high demand in Florence. His most renowned piece is possibly the large scale Vision of Saint Bernard altarpiece, now located in the Walters Art Gallery in Baltimore. Some of his early works include the Virgin and Child with St. John as well as the Holy Family. About a dozen drawings are also attributed to Puligo but none relate to his surviving works or bear resemblance to the styles of his paintings. He is featured in Giorgio Vasari's Vite or Lives of the Artists. According to Vasari, Puligo was a particularly idle artist, which may explain the paucity of his productions. His brother, Jacone Puligo, was also a Renaissance painter. Among his pupils was Domenico Beceri.

== Life ==
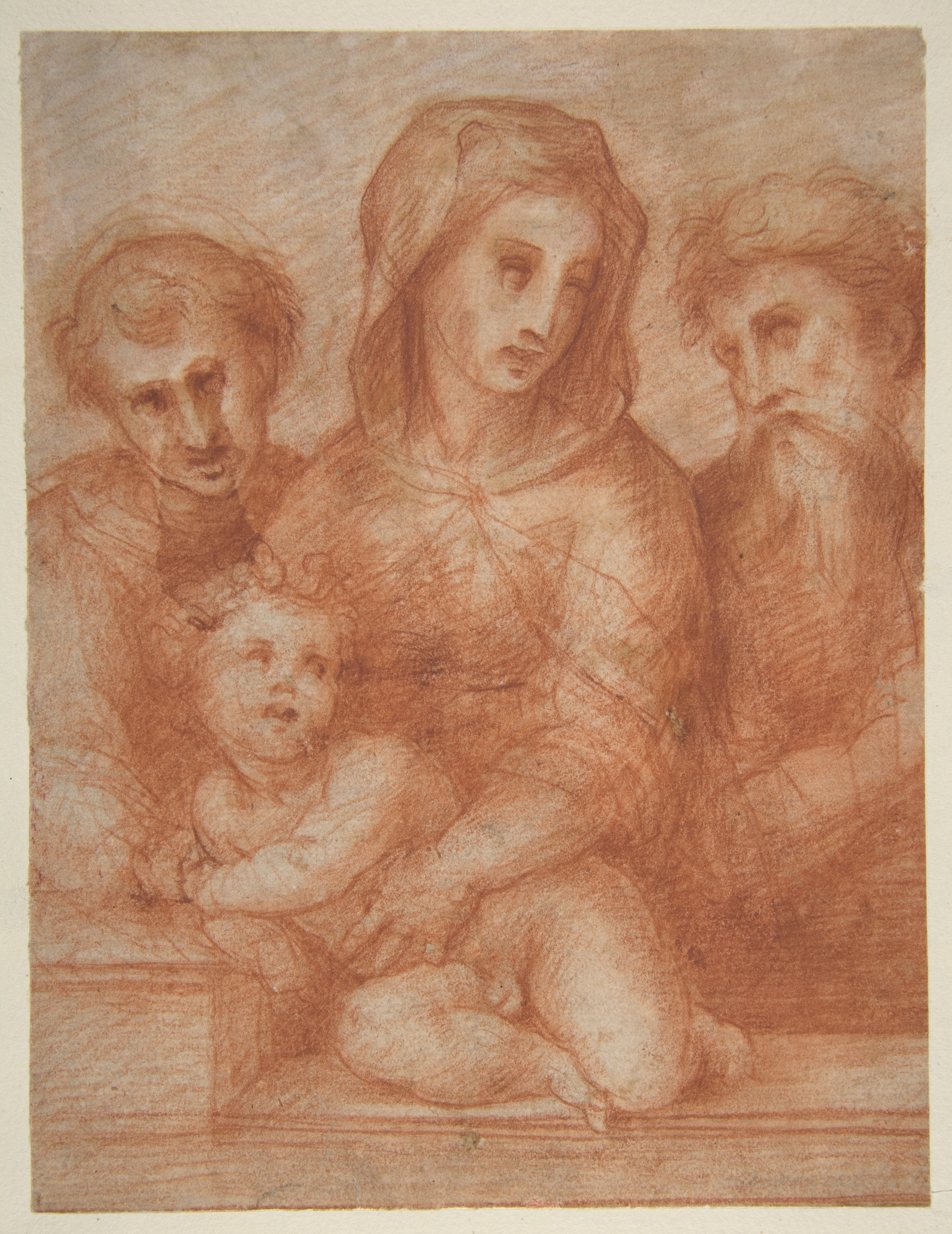
Virgin and Child with Two Saints; Fragmentary Design of a Pietà. Red chalk and soft black chalk. 1515–20. The Metropolitan Museum of Art.

Domenico Puligo came from a family of blacksmiths. His father, Bartolomeo, was a blacksmith and a descendant of the Ubaldini of Marradi in Tuscan Romagna, who were also blacksmiths. His mother was Apollonia, daughter of the goldsmith Antonio di Giovanni. Puligo also had a sister named Francesca. In the early 15th century, the Ubaldini family moved to the village of Ponte a Rifredi on the edge of Florence from their native area. Several years later, the family moved again to the Piazza di San Gallo, resting on the periphery of Porta San Gallo. Here the family lived in a small house that was part of the property of the Spedale di San Gallo.

The earliest record of Puligo is from 1504. Provided by his father to the Estimo del Contado in Florence, Bartolomeo stated that his son was twelve years old, which allowed it to be determined that Puligo was born in 1492. The second record after this initial one dates in 1525, 21 years later, when Puligo was aged 33. Two years later, in 1527, Puligo dies at the age of 35.

Between the second record in 1525 and Puligo's death in 1527, there is an increase in the records of Puligo's activity. Despite the fact that Puligo's name was only recorded in the record book 'Libro Rosso' of the Guild 'Compagnia de' pittori di San Luca', he would have likely completed his apprenticeship earlier and already became an independent master for numerous years, receiving commissions.

Puligo was trained under Ridolfo Ghirlandaio, the son of Domenico Ghirlandaio, who once trained Michelangelo as an apprentice. Puligo was one of the only two apprentices, the other being Antonio del Ceraiuolo, that continued to work with Ghirlandaio for many years, even after they had finished their apprenticeship. According to Vasari, Puligo and Ceraiuolo had received invitations to work in Span and Hungary, but were not enticed even by the guarantee of money and rejected the offers to remain in their own country, where there was still much to be done.

Vasari, who briefly worked in Sarto's workshop and likely came into contact with Puligo, notes Puligo's association with Sarto in his account of the life of Giovanni Francesco Rustici. Rustici and Puligo were two of the twelve men that belonged to the Compagnia di Paiuolo (Company of the Cauldron), which often occupied the Sapienza. It is suggested that this may have led to the meeting of Puligo and Sarto, since Sarto was a member of the Compagnia del Cazzuola, a larger group that was founded in 1512 which also frequented the Sapienza. If this was the case, then Puligo's relation to Sarto would date to the early 16th century.

Puligo married Felice di Francesco Silvani and had three children together, as recorded by Milanesi. The children were named Bartolomeo, Apollonia, and Margherita. Margherita and Bartolomeo both died as children, not long after their father's death. Apollonia was initially married to Filipo di Salvestro di Francesco Baldocci, but after his death she remarried to Amaddio Baccelli.

In September 1527, Puligo contracted the plague. Close to death, his will was drawn up by Andrea Rulli. Soon after, he died and was buried in Florence at San Lorenzo.

== Works ==
Due to the lack of information and documentation on Puligo's life and works, it is difficult to determine the chronology and background of his pieces. Moreover, all of his surviving works are dated in the last few years of his life. Even though Vasari does provide crucial information on his undocumented works, he only mentions pieces from what he considers to be the mature stage of Puligo's artistic growth. At times, his paintings have also been dated stylistically. Hence, any existing dating of Puligo's art works should be viewed as being relative as they can only, at best, be estimations.

=== Mature works ===
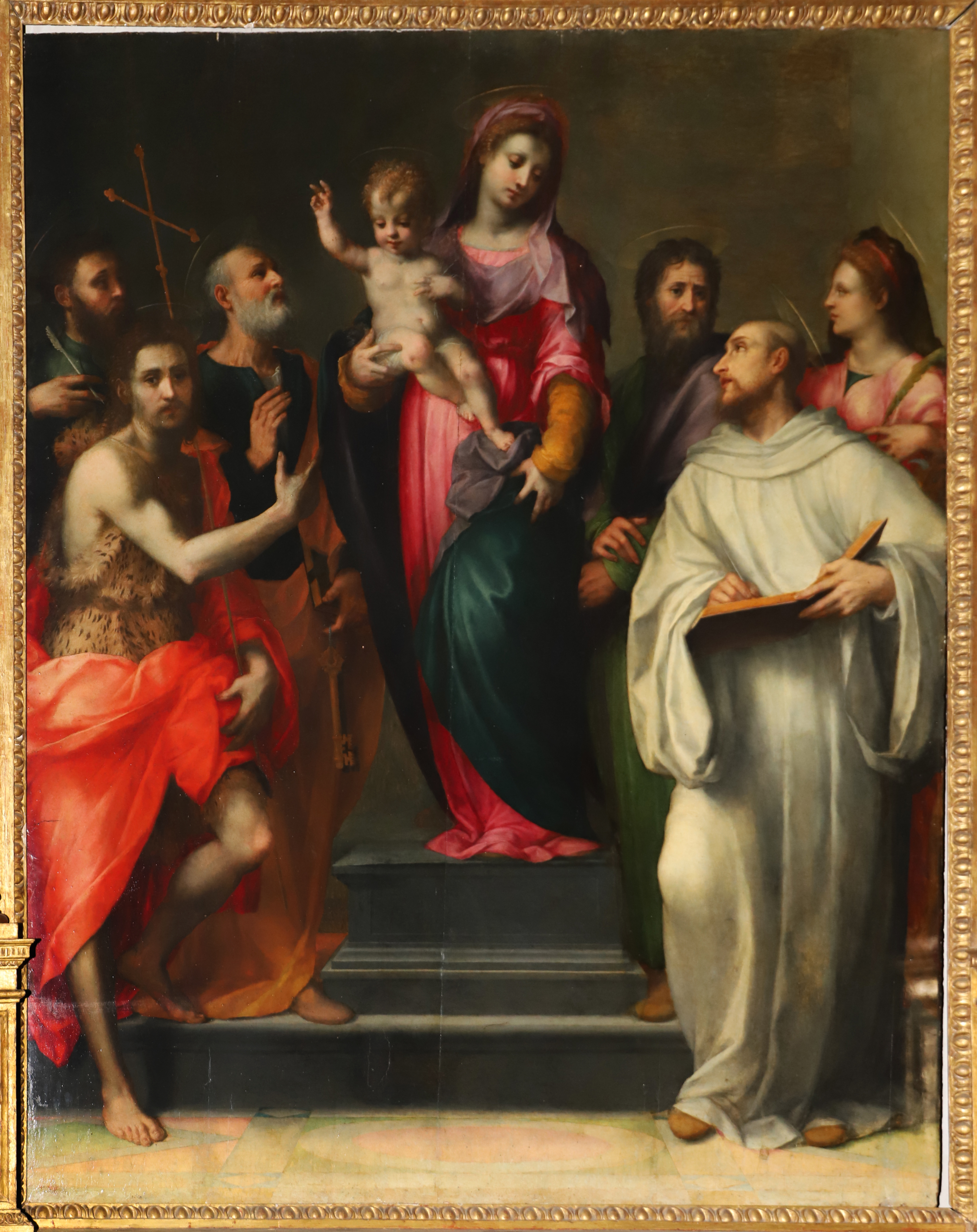
Madonna and Child with Six Saints. 1525–1526. Santa Maria Maddalena de' Pazzi.

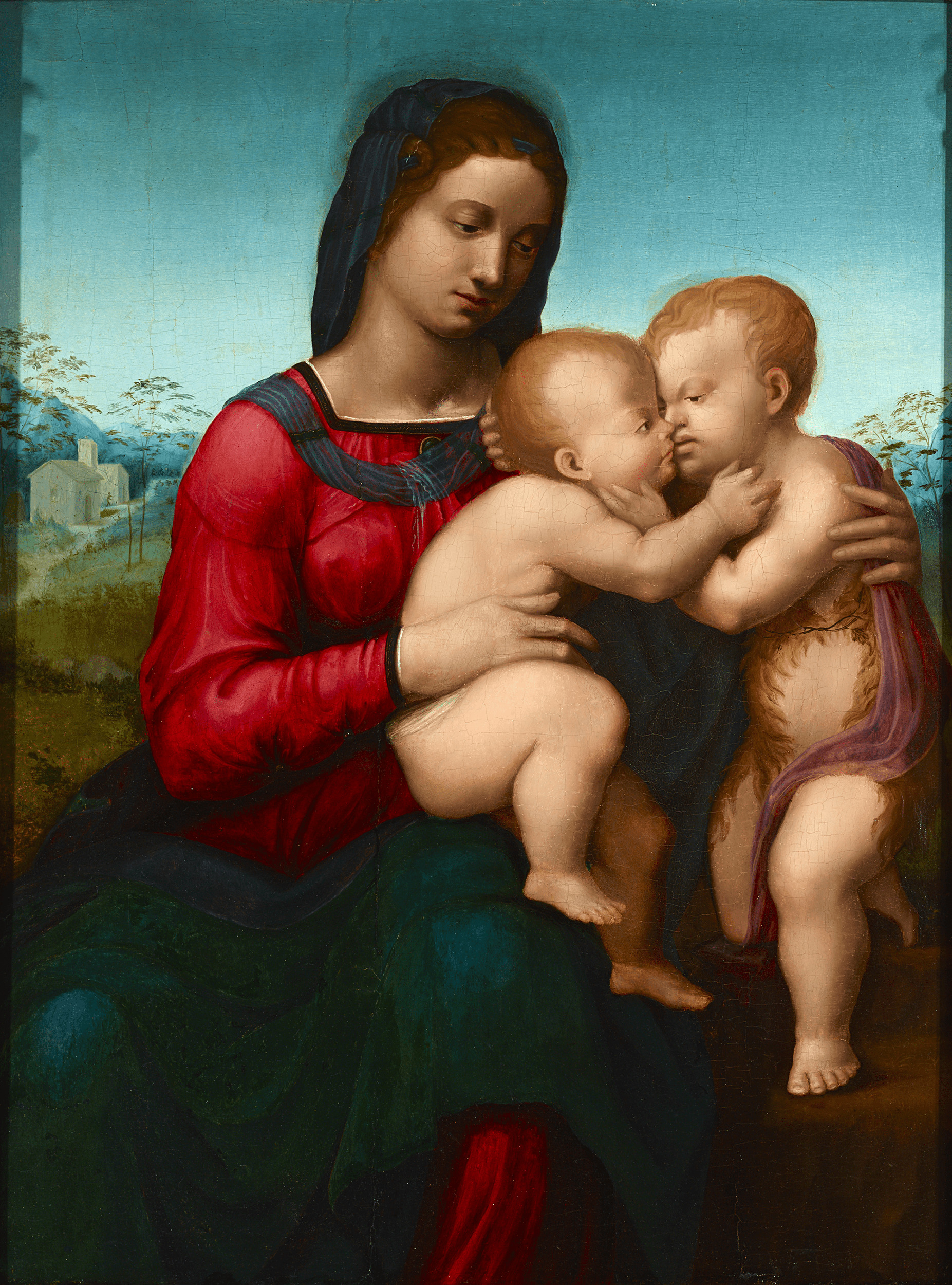
Virgin and Child with the Infant Saint John. Circa 1515. Private collection.

Works from the mature stage of Puligo's artistic career mostly consist of large-scale altarpieces, with some of the most notable being The Vision of St. Bernard, Madonna and Child with Six Saints, Marriage of St. Catherine and St. Peter Martyr, and Holy Family with St. John the Baptist, all of which are securely attributed to him; his largest extant altarpiece is the Deposition. Compared to his earlier creations of Madonna and Child paintings, those produced in the later stage of his career in the 1520s 'have greater compositional and figural complexity, are often larger in dimension, and display voluminous figures which are nearly life-size.' In pieces such as The Vision of St. Bernard and The Deposition, narratives are also presented within the art. Vasari considered Puligo to be most talented apprentice out of all those who were practicing in Ghirlandaio's workshop.

In describing Puligo's artistic style, Vasari states that 'He, considering that his method of painting with softness, without overloading his works with colour or making them hard, but causing the distances to recede little by little as though veiled with a kind of mist, gave his pictures both relief and grace, and that although the outlines of the figures he made were lost in such a way that his errors were concealed and hidden from view in the dark grounds into which the figures merged, nevertheless his coloring and the beautiful expressions of his heads made his works pleasing, always kept to the same method of working and to the same manner, which caused him to be held in esteem as long as he lived.' Vasari also praised Puligo's use of color extensively, saying that he handled color in 'so good and harmonius a manner' 'that it is for that reason, rather than for any other, that he deserves praise.'

==== The Vision of St. Bernard ====
Puligo's Vision is widely regarded as the piece that epitomizes his most classical phase and was praised by Vasari to be the finest of his works. Puligo based this piece on Perugino's painting on the same subject. Despite the difference in the settings of the two painting, it is apparent that the way in which Puligo has arranged the poses of the figures completely duplicates those within Perugino's piece. There are only four figures in the scene, all of whom appear to have inactive stances, amplifying the overall quietude present within the composition. The gestural and visual exchange taking place between the Virgin and St. Bernard occupying each side of the piece, allows the painting to be evenly weighted.

Puligo's finesse with color is demonstrated in Vision, wherein the vibrancy and variety of colors are remarkable. Notably, the Virgin's crimson dress is brightened to a light pink, and juxtaposes the dark blue-green of the Virgin's mantle with its purple lining. The angel to the left of the Virgin dons a bottle-green robe, whereas the one to the right is clothed in golden-orange. Apart from St. Bernard's white robe, the rest of the painting, mostly consisting of the landscape, is immersed in various shades and blends of blue and green. This piece is considered by some critics to be 'a testimony to the artist's own great personal vitality and excellence as a colorist'.

==== Madonna and Child with Six Saints ====
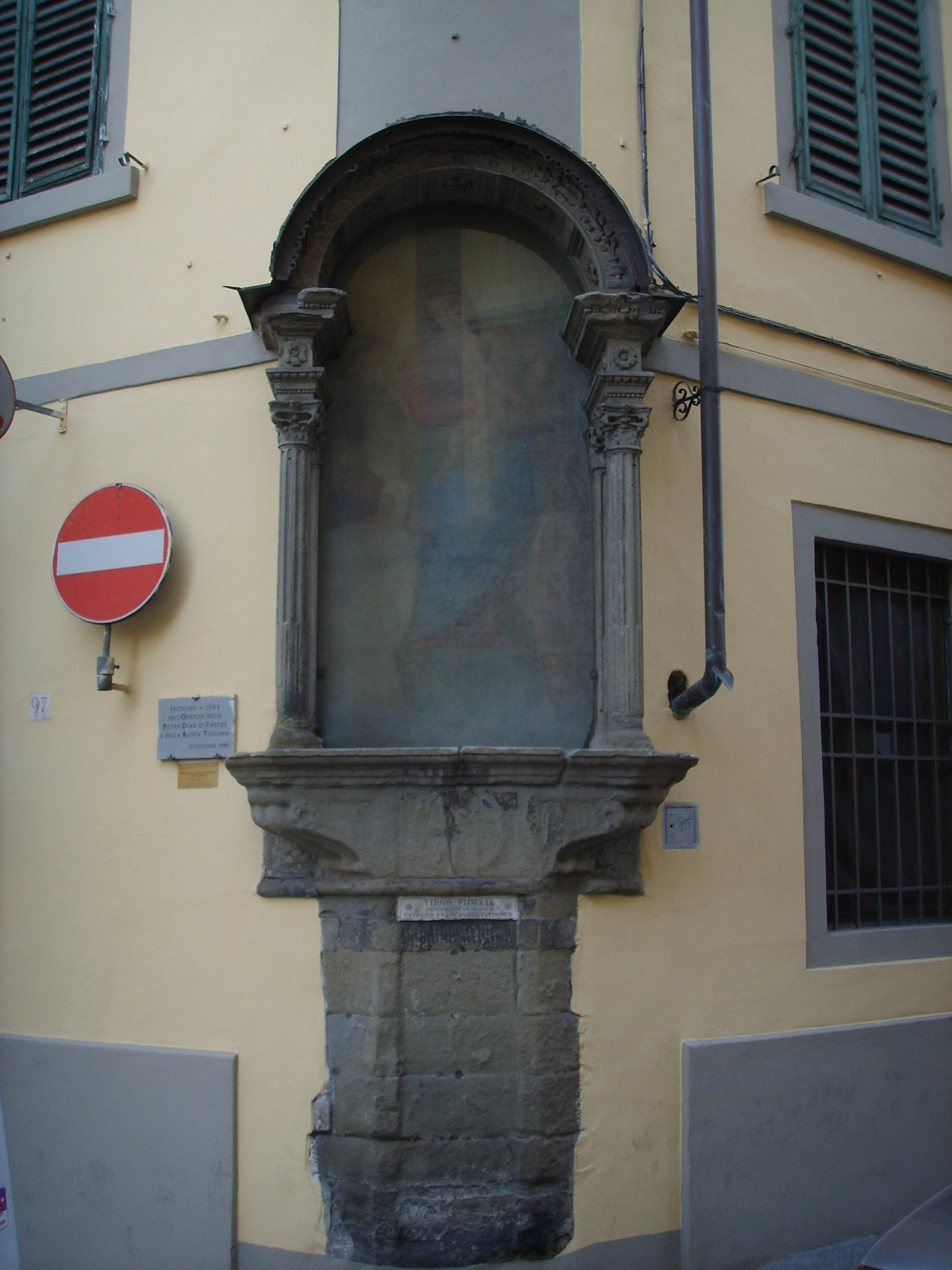
Marriage of St. Catherine with St. Peter Martyr. 1526.

This composition was commissioned about a year, in 1525, after the presumed completion of Vision, as an altarpiece for the Cestello Chapel at Santa Maria Maddalena de' Pazzi in Florence, now known as the da Romena Chapel. In the painting, a Madonna holds the Infant Christ surrounded by six saints: John and Baptist, Paul, Peter, Matthew, Bernard and Catherine of Alexandria. This piece is similar to Vision in terms of size as well as the fact that the figures within are also depicted in full-length. It is said that, in creating this piece, Puligo was influenced by Sarto's Madonna of the Harpies, as well as Fra Bartolomeo's Sacre Conversazioni.

==== Marriage of St. Catherine with St. Peter Martyr ====
Commissioned in 1526, approximately a year after his altarpiece for the Cestello Chapel, this painting is Puligo's only surviving fresco. Featuring Madonna and child with St. Peter Martyr and St. Catherine of Alexandria, the piece was commissioned by the Capitani of the Compagnia di Santa Maria del Bigallo for the tabernacle at the intersection of Via del San Zanobi and Via delle Ruote in Florence. Due to the nature of the fresco, the tabernacle has been subjected to accumulated exposure to outdoor conditions, and is consequently badly damaged. However, the painting remains relatively perceptible. Like the Cestello altarpiece, this piece has also been linked to Sarto's Madonna of the Harpies.

==== Holy Family with St. John the Baptist ====
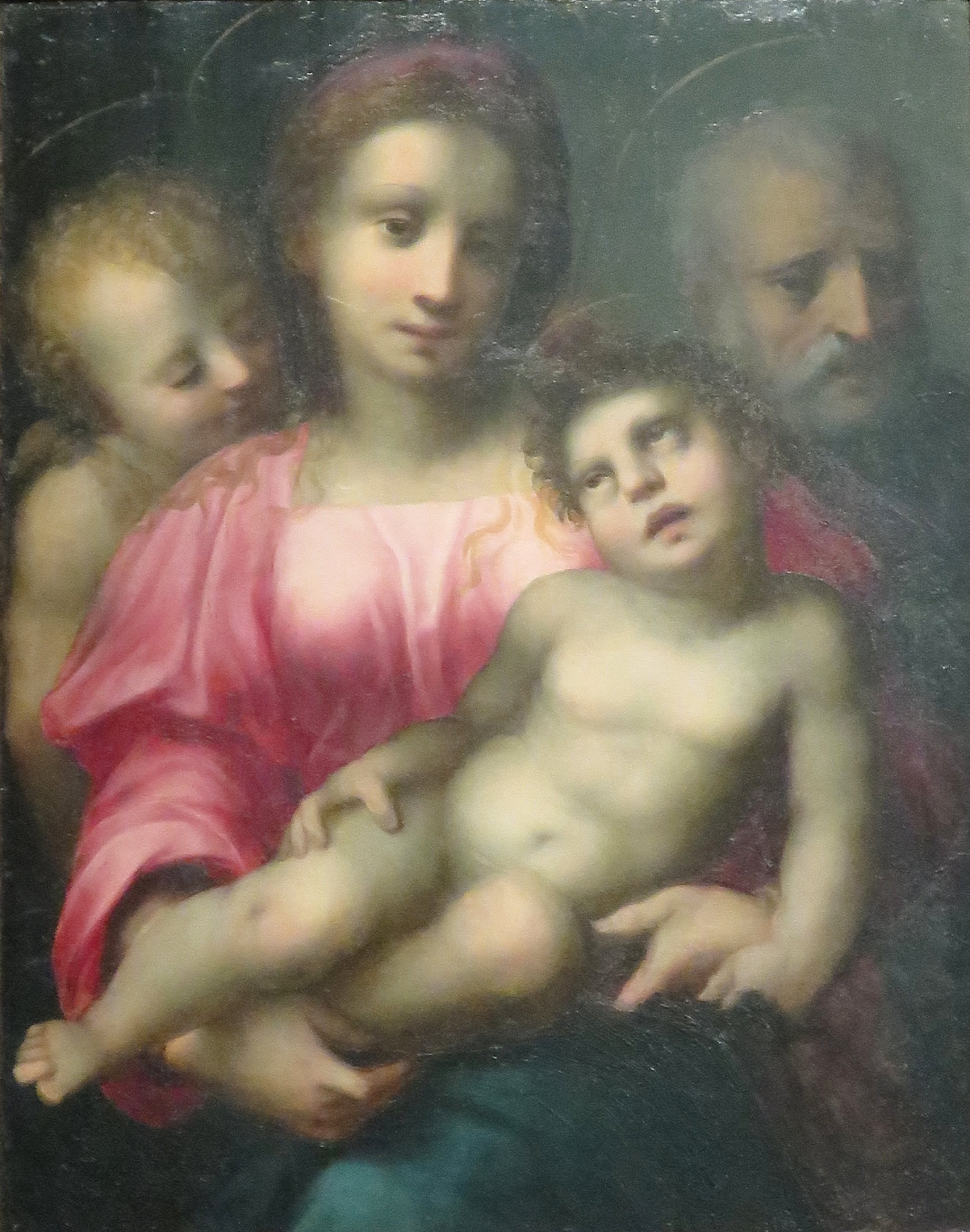
Holy Family with St. John the Baptist. Oil on panel. 1526–1527. Columbus Museum of Art.

The Holy Family is considered as one of Puligo's finest works. Puligo's skill with colour has again been commended in this painting: 'Upon seeing the Holy Family one is immediately struck by the bright vermillion color of the virgin's dress. This red is brought up to a light pink and is set against broad areas of gray hues forming in the background, the head of Joseph, and the shadows of the flesh. Dark blue-green is found in the Virgin's veil and mantle, which is draped across her lap.' The remarkable affected expression on the Christ child not only stands in contrast to the 'dreamy expression' of the Virgin in this painting, but also recurs in both Madonna and Child with St. John the Baptist and Madonna and Child with St. John the Baptist and Three Angels.

==== Deposition from the Cross ====
This altarpiece at the Collegiata di Santa Maria delle Grazie in Anghiari was composed at the very end of Puligo's career, after the tabernacle of St. Catherine and St. Peter Marty of 1526. Cited last by Vasari in his list of Puligo's works, this painting consists of a scene whereby Christ is being lowered from a centrally placed cross to a young man by three other men. For this piece, Puligo took inspiration from Filippino Lippi and Perugino's Deposition for SS. Annunziata.

== Early works and attributions ==
Vasari gives very limited accounts of Puligo's first works, and thus the timeline of his early works is difficult to determine since none that Vasari mentions pre-date 1525. As a result, it is also difficult to deem his early paintings as being securely accredited to him, but rather only as debated attributions. However, Vasari does report that Puligo trained for longer in Ridolfo Ghirlandaio's workshop than the average apprentice, whom would typically become established as an independent master at the age of 18; hence, he is estimated to have only completed his apprenticeship at age 20. Many of the postulations on Puligo's early works are based upon observations and analyses of the style within, and thus are best only approximations.

=== Madonna and Child paintings ===
The Madonna and Child with St. John the Baptist and Two Angels is considered one of Puligo's earliest paintings. Closely resembling Ghirlandaio's Angels of 1507–8, the painting is nonetheless attributed to Puligo, as there is a fundamental difference in style between this work of Puligo and that of Ghirlandaio. The theme of Madonna and Child is replicated in Madonna and Child with Two Angels, a tondo estimated to date to around 1512- 15 that was given to Andrea del Sarto in the antiquarian Borghese inventories; all writers on this subject have agreed with this attribution. Another Madonna and Child with Two Angels from the Saunders collection (1986) is said to epitomize the height of Puligo's early career. This painting is based on his own Madonna and Child with St. John the Baptist and draws from Raphael's Madonna del Granduca. Puligo also took an extensive interest in the Madonna of Humility, and created several paintings related to the subject.

=== Portraits ===
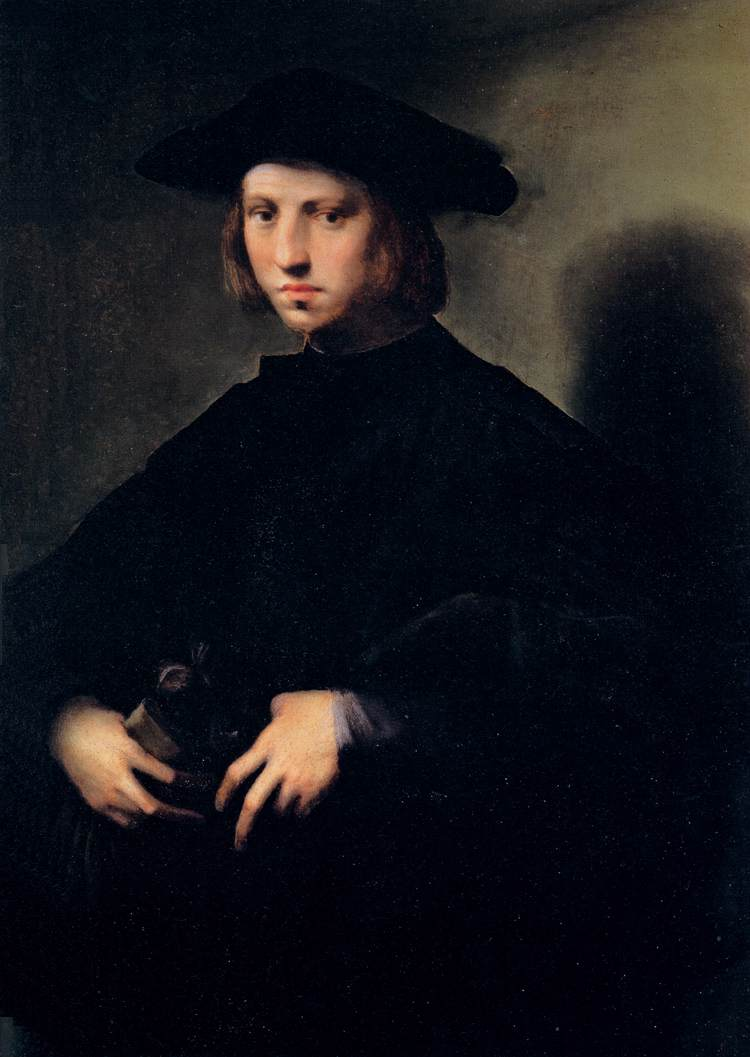
Portrait of Pietro Carnesecchi. Oil on panel. 1527. Uffizi Gallery.

Similarly to the conditions of Puligo's Madonna and Child Paintings, there are very few documented portrait paintings by Puligo, two of which are mentioned by Vasari. The only signed and dated portraiture work attributed to him Puligo is the Portrait of a Young Man Writing. The premise of this attribution rests upon its comparable stylistic qualities with other works by Puligo during the early 1520s, as only Puligo's first name, Domenico, is specified in a 1523 letter addressed to the artist by the sitter. This portrait has been said to have been influenced by Raphael's portrait of Tommaso Inghirami. The two portrait paintings that Vasari mentions are of Barbara Fiorentina and Pietro Carnesecchi. The latter is regarded by Vasari to be the most beautiful of his portraits and is now in the Uffizi Gallery.

Three stages have been identified within Puligo's development as a portrait artist: the early period between around 1512–1517, the early mature period of about 1518–1523, and the mature period of about 1524–1527. As he progresses through the periods, he gains more expertise in his drawing skills, increasing the volume of figures and attending to physical details with more care. In what is considered as his mature period, Puligo's portraits often represented the figures in three-quarter length with great breadth, and sometimes in elongated form.
