= Francesco Brina =

Italian painter

Francesco Brina or Del Brina or Brini (1540 – 1586) was an Italian painter of the Mannerist period, active mainly in Florence.

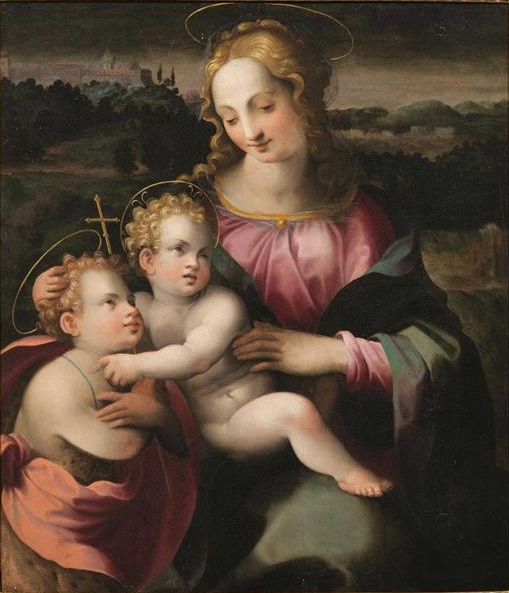
Madonna and child with young St John

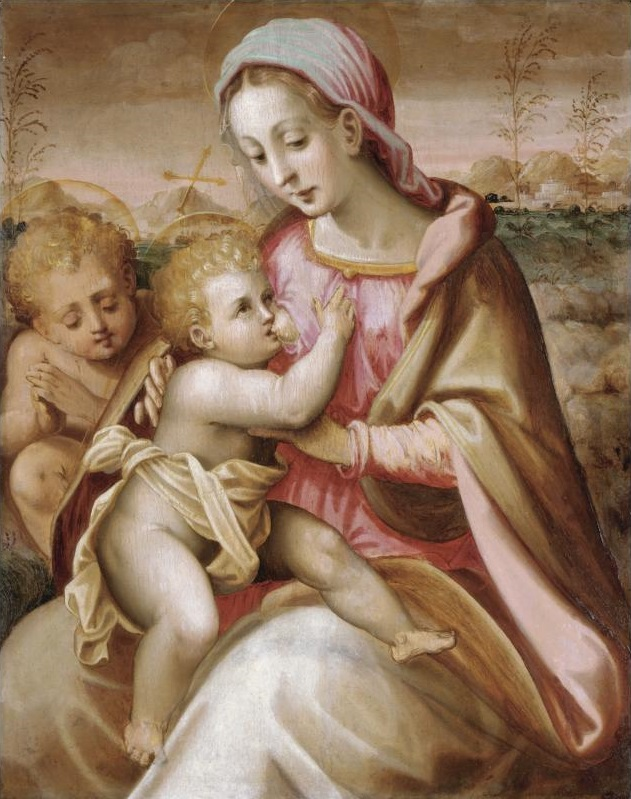
Madonna and child with young St John

S. J. Freedberg ascribes his training to either Ridolfo Ghirlandaio or more likely his son, Michele di Ridolfo. He holds him to have followed the "most conservative adaptation of the Vasarian maniera". He appeared to limit his output to mostly devotional Madonna and Child paintings (madonneri), and in this endeavor, paraphrasing the compositions and expressions of Andrea del Sarto. His brother Giovanni Brina (died 1599) helped Francesco in his work and copied his style .

He painted an Adoration at Santa Felicita, Florence. He painted an Annunciation with Saints for a chapel in the church of San Gaggio, Florence.
