= San Martino a Gangalandi =

Roman Catholic parish (pieve) church in Tuscany, Italy

Coordinates: 43°46′10.17″N 11°5′54.1″E

Pieve di San Martino a Gangalandi
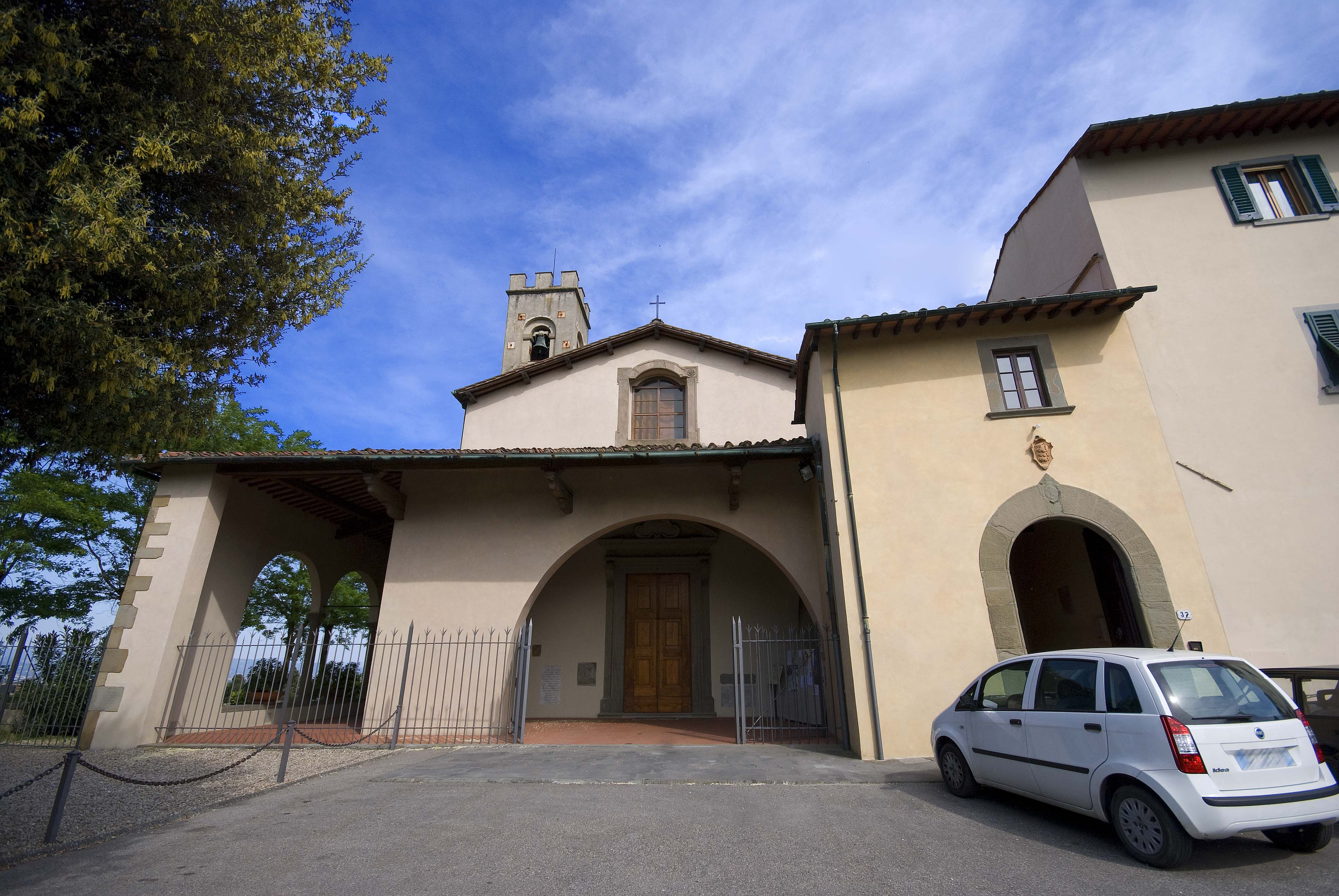
- Facade

Religion
- Affiliation: Roman Catholic

Location
- Location: Lastra a Signa, province of Florence, Italy
- Interactive map of Pieve di San Martino a Gangalandi

Architecture
- Type: Church
- Style: Romanesque with Renaissance refurbishment

San Martino a Gangalandi is a Roman Catholic parish (pieve) church in the Gangalandi neighborhood of Lastra a Signa in the region of Tuscany, Italy. It is located via Leon Battista Alberti. Adjacent to the church is a small Museo Vicariale (Vicarial Museum) displaying some works of art.

== History ==
The church in this district was first documented by 1108. A church was first erected in a Romanesque-style in the 12th-century as an oratory for a Marian confraternity apparently established following the visit to Florence of Saint Peter Martyr. The dedication to St Martin of Tours suggests an earlier Carolingian and Frankish foundation. The church underwent a refurbishment in the 15th century by the Renaissance architect Leon Battista Alberti. Midway along the left flank is a slim tall bell tower.

The interior is notable for frescoes (1433) in the chapel of the Baptistry by Bicci di Lorenzo. The 15th-century baptismal font has sculpted marble reliefs. Other paintings in the interior include:

- Five Saints by Pietro Salvestrini
- Madonna and Child between St Lawrence and the Guardian Angel attributed to Antonio del Ceraiolo
- Virgin of the Assumption between Saints Charles Borromeo, Bartholomew, Francis and Martin (1615) by Matteo Rosselli
- San Cristoforo (fresco left wall)
- Life of St Donnino (13th-century)
- Annunciation attributed to Domenico Passignano, derived from Oratory of Santissima Annunziata
- Tomb of Agnolo Pandolfini (1421)
- Death of St Joseph by Francesco Conti

The adjacent museum, established in 1986 with the financing by the Ente Cassa di Risparmio di Firenze, displays a Madonna of the Humility (circa 1405) painted by Lorenzo Monaco. There is also a triptych attributed to Lorenzo di Bicci and to his son Bicci di Lorenzo: the panels depict Virgin giving her girdle to Saint Thomas in the center, flanked by Saints Nicholas of Bari, Andrew, John the Baptist, and Anthony the Abbot. The museum displays a Madonna and Child by Jacopo del Sellaio. Three panels depicting the Decollation of John the Baptist between Saints Francis of Paola and Carlo Borromeo attributed to Filippo Paladini.
