= Bartolomeo Ghetti =

Bartolomeo Ghetti may refer to:

- Bartolomeo Ghetti (painter) (died 1536), Florentine Renaissance painter
- Bartolomeo Ghetti (sculptor) (died 1708), Italian sculptor
