= Sant'Ilario a Colombaia =

Church building in Florence, Italy

Coordinates: 43.757425°N 11.239056°E

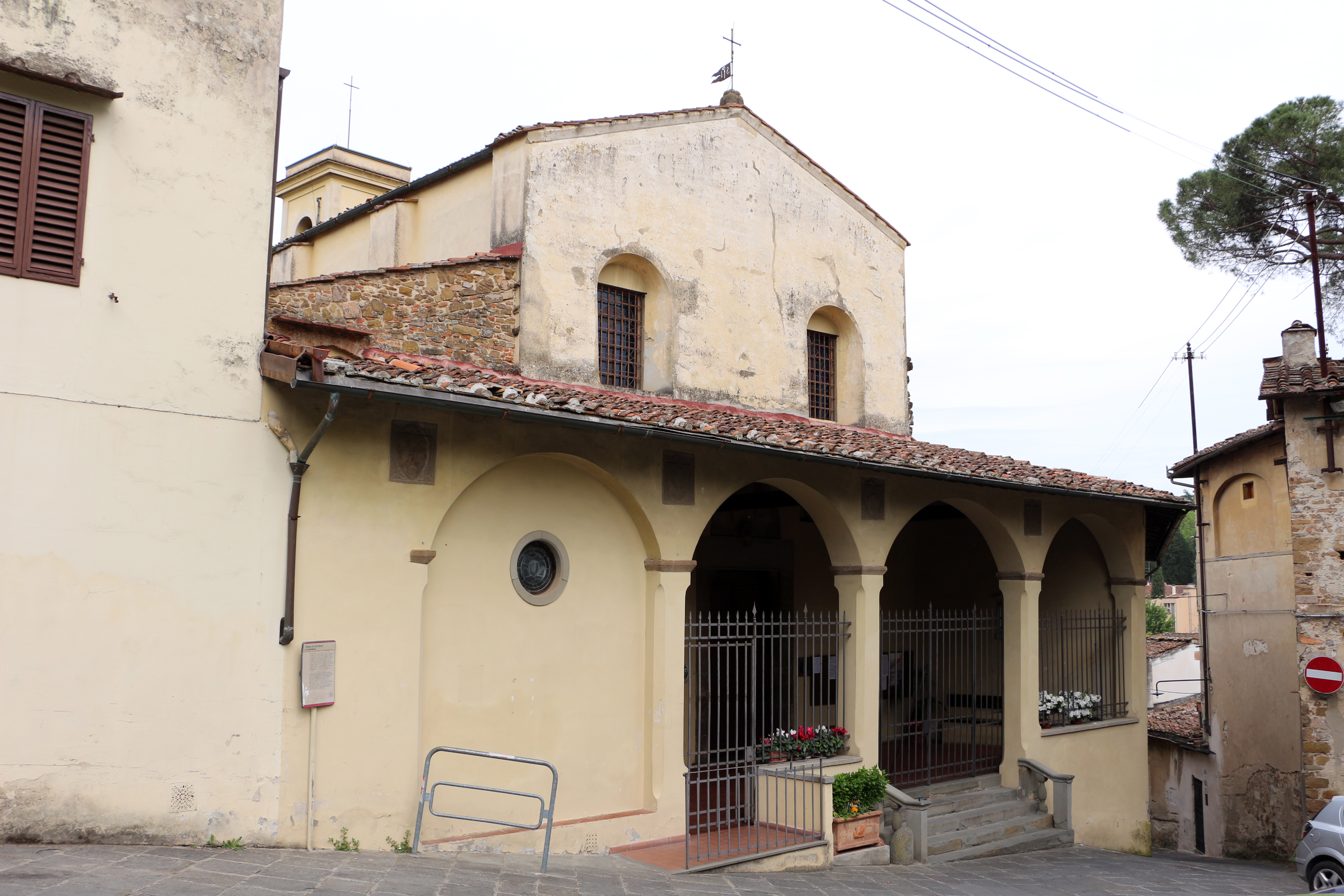
- Facade

Religion
- Affiliation: Roman Catholic

Location
- Location: Florence, Italy
- Interactive map of Sant'Ilario a Colombaia

Architecture
- Type: Church

Sant'Ilario a Colombaia is a Roman Catholic parish church just outside the Porta Romana, in Florence, region of Tuscany, Italy.

== History ==
Documentation of an oratory at the site exists as early as 1072. Pilgrims would have passed by this site on the road to Rome. By the 14th century the oratory was enlarged and transformed into a church dedicated to Saint Hilary, a bishop of Poitiers who died in the fourth century.

Previously, it was called Sant'Ilario alle fonti due to a spring previously found nearby. The name of Colombaia for the neighborhood was already present in ancient documents. The church came under the patronage of noble Florentine families, among them the Adimari, Ghiberti, Donati, and Quaratesi. In 1325, it was nearly razed by the condottiero Castruccio Castracani, and a reconstruction was completed by 1457. Numerous other refurbishments have occurred over the centuries.

== Art and architecture ==
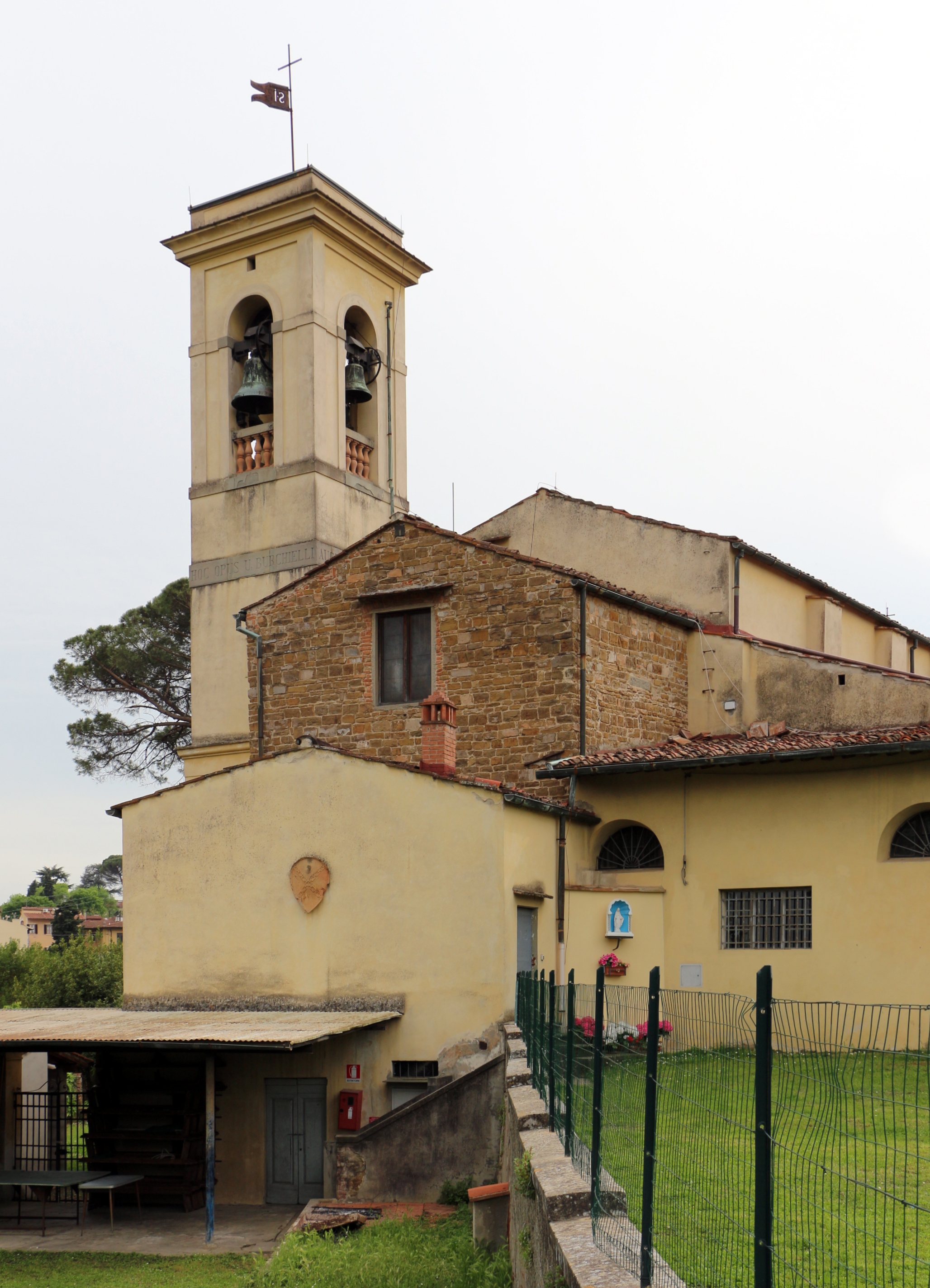
Apse with 19th-century bell-tower

The facade is preceded by a simple fourteenth-century portico; it still retains much damaged 14th–15th century frescoes, including a courtly scene by Stefano d'Antonio. The bell tower was rebuilt in 1880.

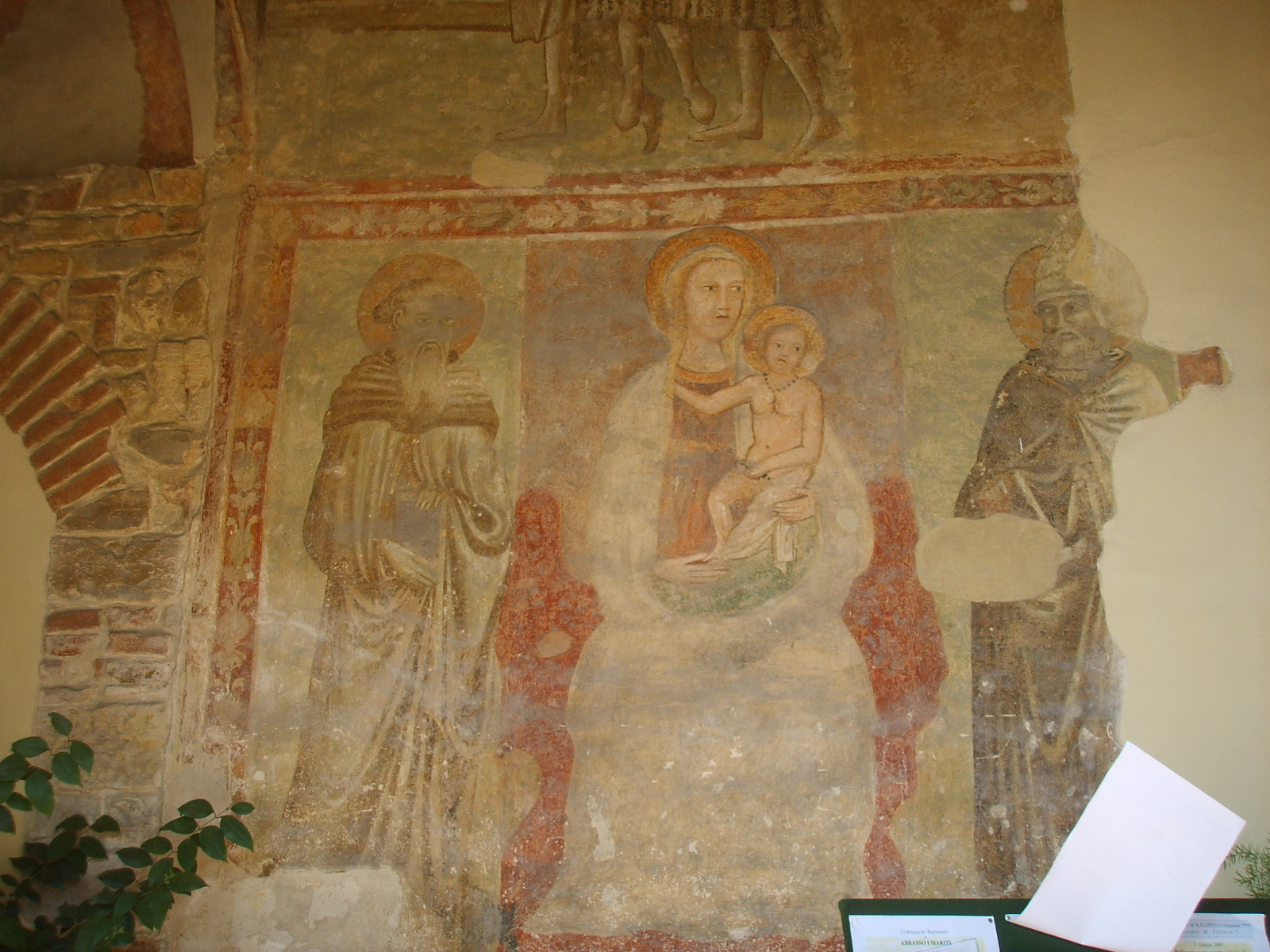
Fresco of Madonna in the portico

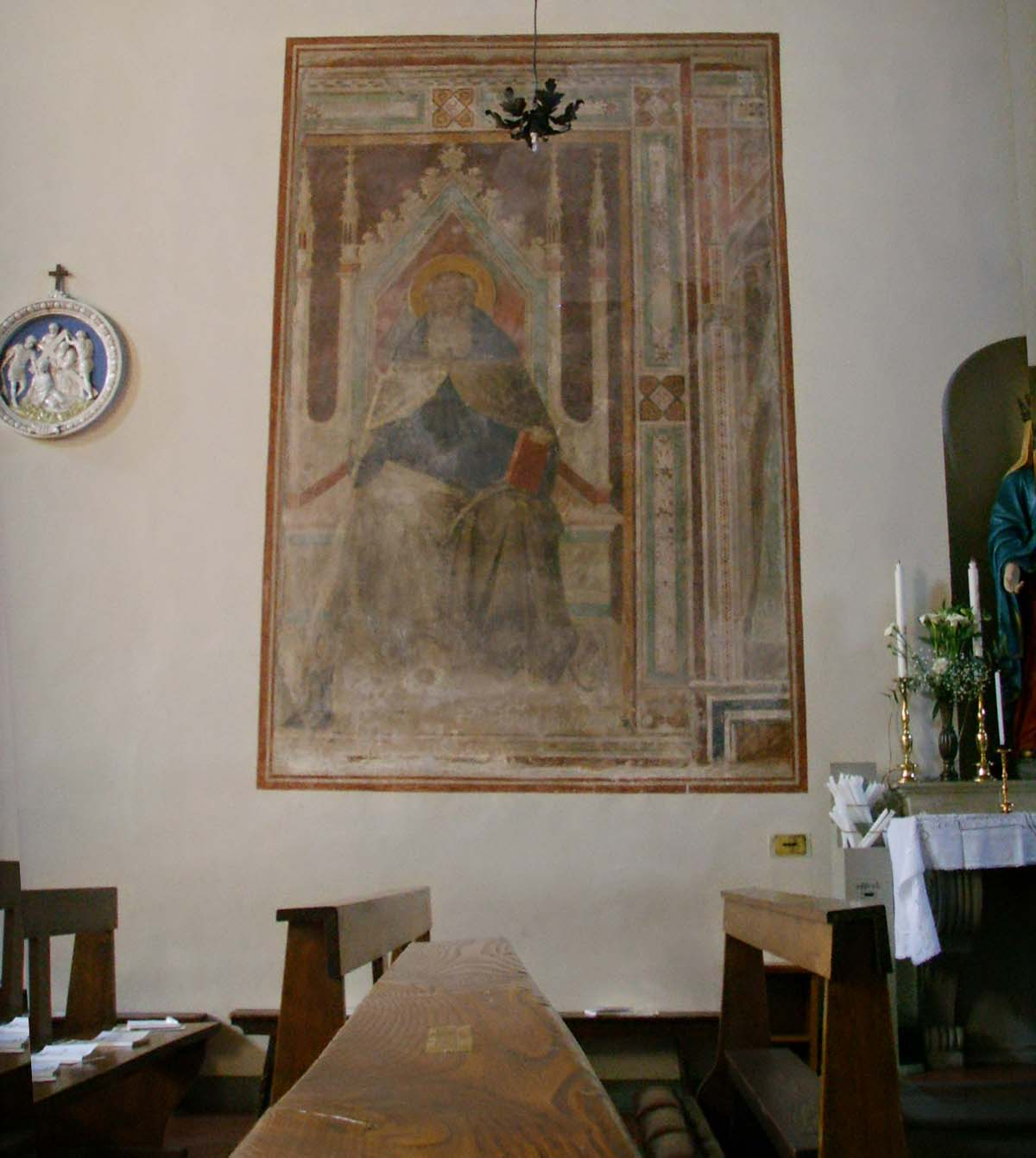
St Antony attributed to Ambrogio di Baldese

The main altar displays a ciborium from the Andrea della Robbia workshop. On the left wall is a fresco depicting St Anthony Abbot (circa 1400) attributed to Ambrogio di Baldese and on the right wall is a Madonna of the Rosary with Saints Dominic and Catherine (1707). The vault has a fresco depicting St Hilary of Poitiers (1713).

The organ pipes on the counter-façade were built in 1842, while the organ itself was brought here in 1810 from the nearby church of San Gaggio.

Adjacent to the church is an oratory erected by the flagellant Confraternity dei Bianchi. The crucifix dates to the end of the 14th century.
