= Michele Tosini =

Italian painter (1503–1577)

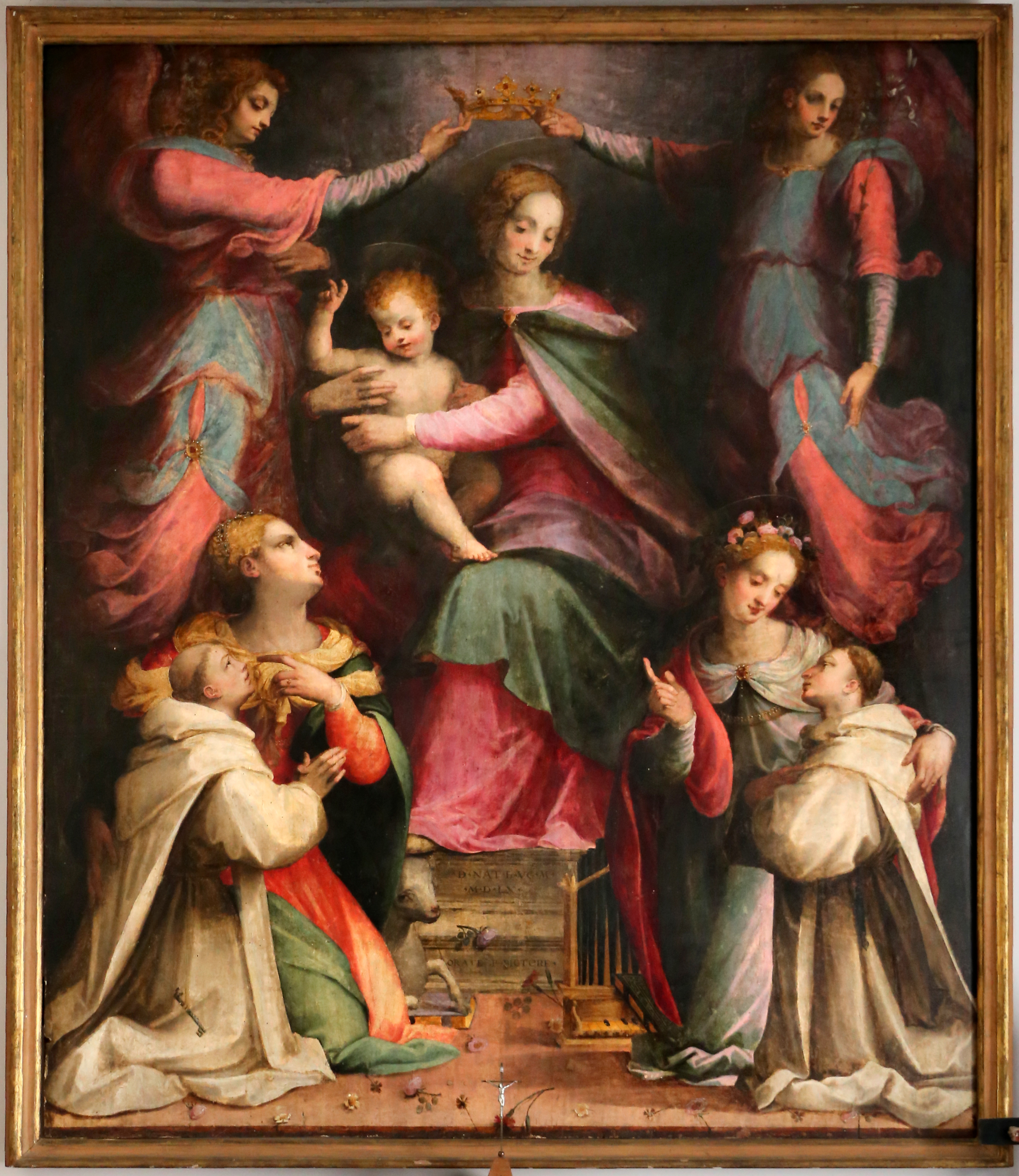
Altarpiece of the Virgin and Child with saints, Santa Maria Novella, Florence

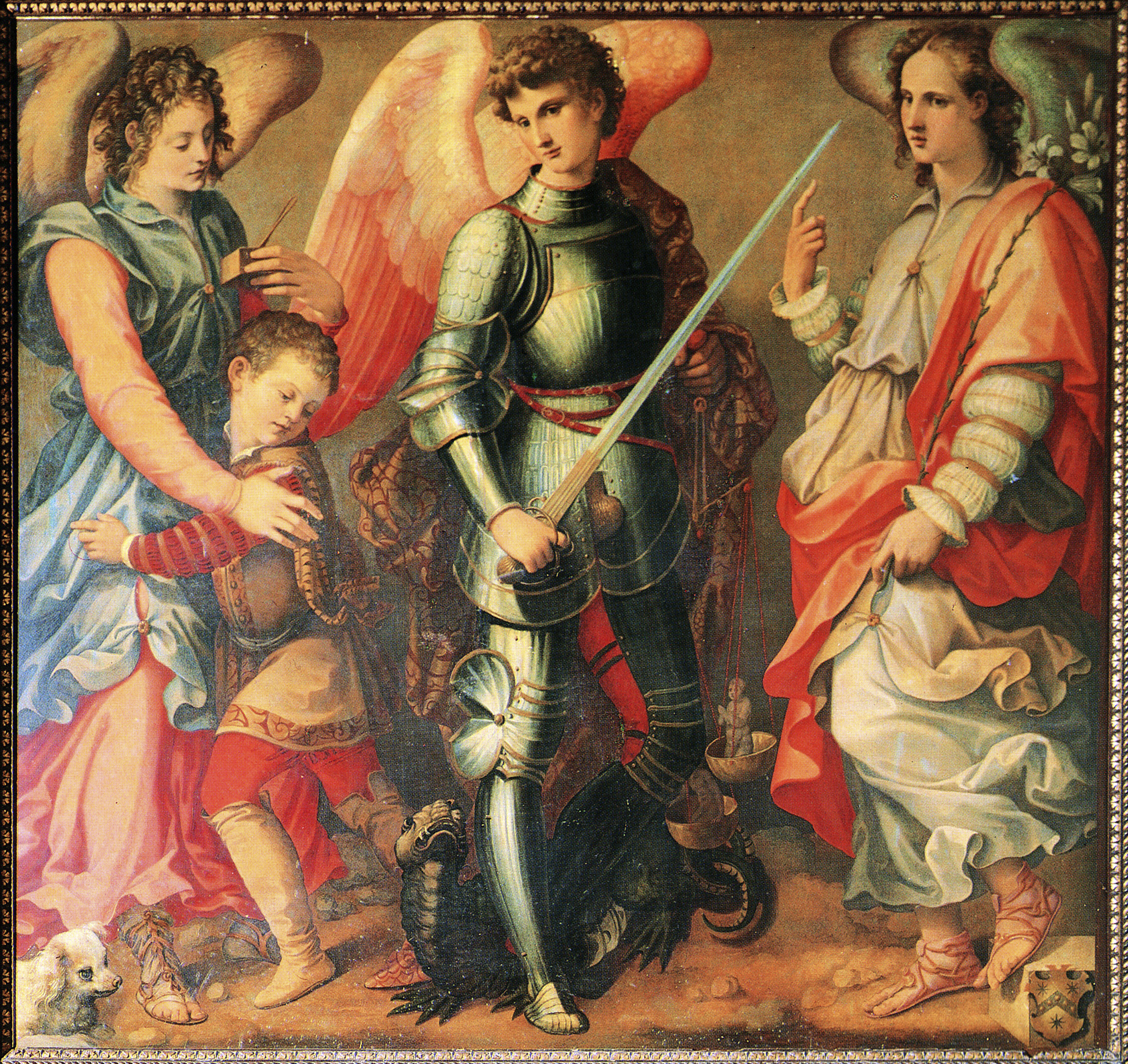
Archangels Raphael, Michael and Gabriel, showing their attributes, including Tobias and his dog for Raphael

Michele Tosini, also called Michele di Ridolfo, (1503–1577) was an Italian painter of the Renaissance and Mannerist period, who worked in Florence.

== Biography ==
He apprenticed initially with Lorenzo di Credi and Antonio del Ceraiolo, but then moved into the studio of Ridolfo Ghirlandaio, from whom he acquired the name Michele di Ridolfo or Michele (di Ridolfo) del Ghirlandaio. Some sources claim Tosini was the son of Ridolfo, but he was just a student of him.

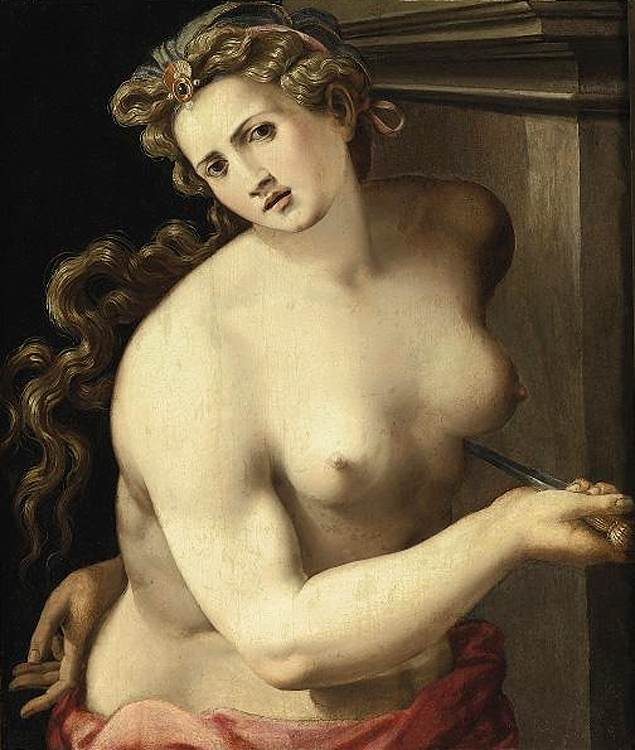
Lucretia, 1540s. Oil on panel, private collection.

Tosini began painting in the early 16th-century Florentine style of Fra Bartolommeo and Andrea del Sarto (e.g. the Virgin of the Sacred Girdle, c. 1525; Florence, San Marco). His acceptance of Mannerism was slow, but by the 1540s the influence of Salviati and Bronzino was visible in his work. After 1556, Tosini served as an assistant to Giorgio Vasari in the decoration of the Salone dei Cinquecento in the Palazzo Vecchio in Florence. Through Vasari's example, Tosini adopted a vocabulary derived from the work of Michelangelo and painted some of his best-known works in this manner (e.g. Night, c. 1560; Rome, Galleria Colonna, and Leda, c. 1560; Rome, Galleria Borghese).

He executed several important commissions late in his career: the fresco decoration of three city gates of Florence (1560s), the altar in the chapel at the Villa Caserotta (1561), near San Casciano Val di Pesa, and the paintings on the sides and back of the tabernacle of the high altar of Santa Maria della Quercia (1570), Viterbo. According to Vasari, Tosini headed a large workshop that executed numerous altarpieces and paintings. He was also a notable portraitist.

Tosini was a mentor to Bernardino Poccetti and Francesco Brina.

== Collections ==
Michele Tosini is represented in the following collections amongst others: National Gallery, London; Czartoryski Museum; Hunterian Museum and Art Gallery, University of Glasgow; McMullen Museum of Art at Boston College; Palmer Museum of Art at Pennsylvania State University; State Museums of Florence Digital Archive, Italy; Galleria Borghese.
