= Jacone Puligo =

Italian painter

Jacone Puligo was an Italian painter of the Renaissance period, active in Florence. He was the brother of Domenico Puligo, was also an apprentice to Andrea del Sarto.
