= Pietro Carnesecchi =

Italian humanist (1508–1567)

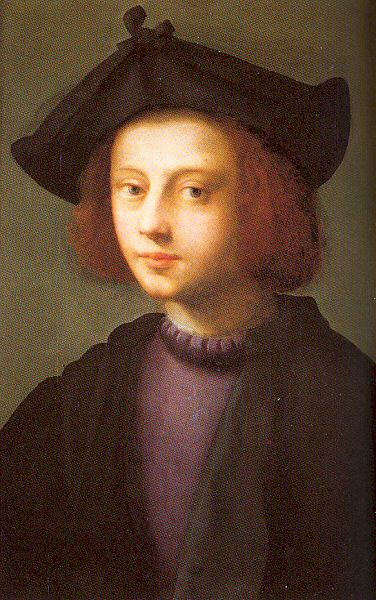
Pietro Carnesecchi (portrait by Domenico Puligo).

Pietro Carnesecchi (24 December 1508 – 1 October 1567) was an Italian humanist.

== Biography ==
Born in Florence, he was the son of a da Andrea Carnesecchi, a merchant who under the patronage of the Medici, and especially of Giulio de' Medici as Pope Clement VII, rapidly rose to high office at the papal court.

He came into touch with the new learning at the house of his maternal uncle, Cardinal Bernardo Dovizi, in Rome. At the age of twenty-five he held several rich livings, had been notary and protonotary to the Curia and was first secretary to the pope, in which capacity he conducted the correspondence with the nuncios (among them Pier Paolo Vergerio in Germany) and a host of other duties.

By his conduct at the conference with Francis I of France at Marseille he won the favour of Catherine de' Medici and other influential personages at the French court, who in later days befriended him. He made the acquaintance of the Spanish reformer Juan de Valdés at Rome, and got to know him as a theologian at Naples, being especially drawn to him through the appreciation expressed by Bernardino Ochino, and through their mutual friendship with the Lady Giulia Gonzaga, whose spiritual adviser he became after the death of Valdés. He became a leading spirit in the literary and religious circle that gathered round Valdés in Naples, and that aimed at effecting from within the spiritual reformation of the church. Under Valdés' influence he wholeheartedly accepted Luther's doctrine of justification by faith, though he repudiated a policy of schism.

He was also an intimate friend of the poet Vittoria Colonna, whom he met in Fondi in 1535.

When the movement of suppression began, Carnesecchi was implicated. For a time he found shelter with his friends in Paris, and from 1552 he was in Venice leading the party of reform in that city. In 1557 he was cited (for the second time) before the tribunal in Rome, but refused to appear. The death of Pope Paul IV and the accession of Pope Pius IV in 1559 made his position easier, and he came to live in Rome. With the accession of Pope Pius V in 1566 the Roman Inquisition renewed its activities with fiercer zeal than ever.

Carnesecchi was in Venice when the news reached him, and betook himself to Florence, where, thinking himself safe, he was betrayed by Duke Cosimo I de' Medici, who wished to curry favour with the pope. From July 1566 he lay in prison over a year. On 21 September 1567 a sentence of degradation and death was passed on him and sixteen others, ambassadors from Florence vainly kneeling to the pope for some mitigation, and on 1 October he was publicly beheaded and then burned.
