= Bartolomeo Ghetti (painter) =

Italian painter

Bartolomeo (or Baccio) di Zanobi Ghetti (died 1536) was a Florentine Renaissance painter who has only recently emerged from obscurity as a result of art historical research.

== Biography ==
Our knowledge of Ghetti's career rests chiefly on a brief notice by Vasari, a few mentions in documents, and half a dozen jewel-like, painstakingly finished paintings. Vasari briefly mentions Ghetti, whom he calls "Baccio Gotti" in the Lives, describing him as a pupil of Ghirlandaio and stating that he worked in France at the court of King Francois I.

Until 2003, no works by Ghetti were known; on that year documents were published by Louis Alexander Waldman showing the artist had painted and restored a number of works for the church of San Pietro a Selva, near Malmantile, a neighborhood of Lastra a Signa in the lower Arno valley. The only sixteenth-century painting in the church is a frescoed lunette depicting the Madonna and Child. Waldman (2003) identified this painting as a work of a follower of Ridolfo Ghirlandaio, called the Master of the Copenhagen Charity (the name came from his most beautiful work, an allegory of Charity now in the Statens Museum for Kunst, Copenhagen). The conjunction of the painting and the document led to the identification of the Master of the Copenhagen Charity as Bartolomeo Ghetti.

== Career in France and Florence ==
As noted by Waldman (2003) Ghetti can almost certainly be identified with the painter and illuminator “Barthélemy Guéty” who is named in a number of payment records surviving from the court of François I. From these we learn that Ghetti had already worked for François at some time before his accession in 1515, and that the painter received payments and salary as court painter and valet de chambre in 1519 and between 1521 and 1532. The payments records reveal that, together with Matteo dal Nassaro, Ghetti designed the rich set of hangings, with subjects drawn from Virgil's Bucolics, that were produced to decorate a so-called Chambre verte in 1521. Further payments from the French king survive from 1528 and 1529. He was still producing pictures and also illuminating manuscripts for the king in 1532, when François paid him 300 écus for two designs of figures from histories and poetry, satyrs and nymphs, that the king wished to decorate the Hall of jeu de paulme of the Louvre (possibly cartoons for tapestries) and for two Books of Hours. Ghetti received a donative from the king in April 1532, recorded in a document that indicates that François was hoping by this means to keep him his court: “par forme de pention et bienfaict, et pour s’entretenir à son service.”

Ghetti must have traveled between Florence and France a number of times over the course of his career, as indicated by the document that record his presence in both locations. Though, as we have seen, he worked for François I before 1515, “Bartholomeus Zenobii Ghetti” was present at a meeting of the Florentine Compagnia di San Jacopo, called “La Sgalla” on 1 January 1516 (modern style). He may have worked in France for a considerable period during the years between 1516 and 1524, during which time there is no documentation for his presence in Italy. In 1525, though, Ghetti was again in Florence, where he made payments to the Compagnia di San Luca and was recorded in the books of yet another Florentine confraternity, the Compagnia di San Sebastiano. In the same year the Compagnia di San Giovanni of Fucecchio decided to commission an altarpiece for their oratory, which Ghetti would subsequently execute (his sole surviving large-scale work). In 1527we find the artist engaged in a dispute with the rector of San Pietro a Selva (near Malmantile) over some work he had recently done for that church. He appointed a procurator in Florence in May 1528, undoubtedly with a view to returning to France; as noted, his presence at the court of François I is documented later in the same year and into 1529. It would appear that the painter returned definitively to Florence some time between his receipt of the 1532 donative from the French king (which in the end failed to achieve its aim) and 7 December 1533, when, as a new document reveals, he appears on the membership rolls of the Florentine confraternity, the Compagnia dello Scalzo. Antonio Mini's letter mentioning Ghetti, quoted earlier, may have been occasioned by the painter's definitive return to Florence, where a succession of documents confirm his presence in Florence between 1535 and his death (which occurred around June 1536).

== Work as Manuscript Illuminator in France ==
In 1894 Durrieu and Marquet de Vasselot speculatively identified “Barthélemy Guéty” (whom they believed to have been French) as the possible illuminator of three illuminated manuscripts, two of which were made for François I or his mother, Louise of Savoy. The volumes are: Ovid's Heroïdes in the French translation of Octavien de Saint-Gelais (Dresden, Sächsische Landesbibliothek − Staats- und Universitätsbibliothek, Ms. O.65), a manuscript whose provenance is unknown; an Oraisons de Cicéro en françois produced for François I (Paris, Bibl. Nat., Ms. fr. 1738); and the Faicts et gestes de la Royne Blanche d’Espagne written and illuminated for Louise (Bibl. Nat., Ms. fr. 5715). The Cicero contains one sole miniature depicting François I at the Battle of Marignano and the Faicts et gestes includes a single illumination which depicts Louise of Savoy in the guise of Blanche of Castille enthroned and accompanied by an invalid (possibly symbolizing the misfortune of the state after enduring the death of the king). The Dresden Ovid, however, is richly illustrated. Its rich and ornate illuminations possess an undeniably Italianate flavor, particularly in their deeply receding landscapes and ornate all’antica architecture. The courtly and elegant ladies depicted in the miniatures, with their oval faces, high foreheads, and elaborate hairstyles bear a distinct affinity to the female figures in Ghetti's panel paintings. There is a remarkable similarity in the way in which figures tend to be reduced to geometric solids, which are carefully modeled with light and shadow. The female figures tend toward the sturdy, and the hands share something of the same angularity found in Ghetti's work on panel. Such suggestive visual comparisons as these urge that the miniatures in the three manuscripts deserve further investigation as possible works by Ghetti.

== Works in Fucecchio ==
Ghetti's largest work is his Madonna and Child with Saints John the Baptist, Mark, Andrew and Peter and Baptism of Christ now in the Collegiata of Fucecchio. This work was evidently admired by early viewers, since a partial copy of the picture made in 1641 by Andrea di Giovanni Battista Ferrari exists at the nearby parish church of San Bartolomeo at Gavena. More recently, Sydney Freedberg justly called the Fucecchio altarpiece a work of ‘great force and originality’.

The patron and date of the Fucecchio altarpiece are identified by a deliberation in the records of a confraternity in that town, the Compagnia di San Giovanni Battista, dated 10 June 1525. The Compagnia, whose residence was adjacent to the Collegiata of Fucecchio, appointed three of its members as procurators to commission ‘a new, suitable and elegant panel for the altar of the said Compagnia, with those figures and ornaments which shall seem fitting to the said procurators’. The procurators were also given the authority to negotiate the price of the new altarpiece they were commissioning. In all likelihood they commissioned Ghetti's altar-piece shortly after the deliberation was made in the summer of 1525, and the San Pietro a Selva lunette was probably painted not too long before the laudum of September 1527, the similarities between the two pictures are easy to comprehend. Together these two works represent the cornerstones on which any chronology of Ghetti's stylistic development must be based.

A passage from the 1541 statutes of the Compagnia di San Giovanni Battista at Fucecchio reveals that the altar of their oratory, adjacent to the Collegiata but deconsecrated in the late eighteenth century, had a dual dedication to the Virgin and St. John the Baptist. Since both John appears prominently in Ghetti's Madonna and Child at Fucecchio and in the Baptism now displayed above it, there is good reason to believe that both these panels were made to be displayed over the altar of the oratory of the Compagnia di San Giovanni Battista.

The original format of the Fucecchio altarpiece is not entirely certain, though it is probable that the lunette with the Baptism of Christ was always located above the lower panel depicting the Madonna and Child with saints. Both panels have been cut down drastically from their original dimensions, and the lunette — apparently chopped down to an uncomfortable and much smaller arched format at an unknown date — was subsequently reintegrated with new spandrels in order to fill it out as a rectangle. An inventory of artworks transferred to the Collegiata of Fucecchio by the Opera di San Salvatore after the latter's suppression by Grand Duke Pietro Leopoldo (2 June 1790) describes the altarpiece in essentially its present configuration, with the Baptism of Christ above the sacra conversazione. The condition of the whole is described by the inventory as ‘middling’ (mediocre). This seems to accord with the state of the surface as we see it today; the results of a previous overcleaning were revealed during the course of a restoration by Sandra Pucci in 1995.

The composition of Ghetti's altarpiece at Fucecchio — featuring the Virgin on an elevated throne and covered by a canopy, set against a colonnaded apse and flanked by standing saints — reflects Raphael's unfinished Madonna del Baldacchino, a work that cast a long shadow in early-Cinquecento Florentine painting. Ghetti copied the figure of St. Peter at lower right from Granacci's Madonna and Child with Sts. John the Baptist, Nicholas of Bari, Anthony Abbot and Peter at Montemurlo — curiously, the same figure that his fellow Florentine Giovanni Larciani had copied in his own Fucecchio altarpiece only a few years earlier.

Like his work at nearby San Pietro a Selva, Ghetti's commission at Fucecchio may have come about (in part at least) by way of local family connections. Archival records reveal that Florentine nun, Margherita di Domenico Ghetti. quite possibly a relative of the painter, was in the Clarissan convent of Sant’Andrea at Fucecchio from at least April 1529 through the end of the 1530s, serving as its abbess in 1531–32; the circumstance suggests some ancestral connection between the Ghetti clan of Florence and the town of Fucecchio. In any event, the extent of Bartolomeo Ghetti's activity in the lower Valdarno suggests that his family may have had roots in this region. Parallels could be drawn with Ghetti's contemporaries. Larciani who found a ready market for his work in the Arno valley from which his ancestors had migrated to Florence. And Rosso Fiorentino migrated during this period to Arezzo and its surrounding towns — from one of which, years earlier, his father had emigrated to Florence.

== Missing Virgin and Child with St. John ==
Waldman (2003) first identified Ghetti as the author of a panel depicting the Madonna and Child with St. John, property of the Seminario Patriarcale of Venice. Although this picture mysteriously disappeared from the Seminario's Pinacoteca a few decades ago, the work was well photographed as a result of a traditional attribution to Raphael, and on the basis of a clear Alinari photograph dating from the early years of the twentieth century it has been possible to identify the painting's true author with a more than reasonable degree of certainty.

Ghetti's lost Madonna and Child, which measures 54 x 50 cm., forms part of the historic collection of marchese Federico Manfredini (1743–1829), the wealthy and influential counselor of the Grand Dukes of Tuscany. Born into the provincial nobility at Rovigo in 1743, Manfredini first rose to prominence as a military commander in Austrian service. His career at the Tuscan court of Lorraine began in 1776, when Grand Duke Pietro Leopoldo summoned him as tutor to his children. Under Pietro Leopoldo's son and successor Ferdinando III, Manfredini was appointed Maggiordomo Maggiore, and negotiating in this guise with Napoleon in 1797 he briefly preserved the independence of the Grand Duchy. Forced to flee with his sovereign before Napoleon's forces only two years later, Manfredini fell into disgrace and was exiled to Sicily. In 1803, when Ferdinando III was compensated for the loss of Tuscany with the title of Prince Elector and Duke of Salzburg, Manfredini returned to his former position at the Grand Ducal court. But he retired from public life, officially on account of a riding accident, in 1805, making his home at first in Padua and subsequently at his villa at Campo Verardo, in the Venetian terraferma, where he died in 1829.

According to early authors, the Madonna and Child with St. John comes from the Grand Ducal collection at Palazzo Pitti, from which the picture — already bearing the optimistic attribution to Raphael — was presented to Manfredini by Grand Duke Pietro Leopoldo of Tuscany. The Alinari photograph shows the inner part of the work's gilt frame, consisting of a cyma molding and, around it, a row of oblong beads; this is easily recognizable as the standard cornice da collezionista given by Manfredi to many of his paintings, and which still graces a large proportion of the paintings in the Seminario of Venice. The celebrity of Manfredini's “Raphael” is attested by the existence of copy, known only from an old photograph in the Fototeca Berenson. A note on the back indicates that it is on canvas and belonged to the Carlo Foresti collection in Milan as of in October 1926. This version has a slick, glib quality that suggests it is probably a replica created around the end of the eighteenth century or the beginning of the nineteenth — perhaps as a substitute for the original that was given away by the Grand Duke.

The traditional attribution to Raphael endured for well over a century after Manfredini acquired it, still appearing (but with a question mark) on the early twentieth century photograph by Alinari. According to tradition, Charles Le Brun perceived in it the emergence of Raphael's first truly individual style, after throwing off the manner of Perugino. It was accepted by Edwards in his 1809 inventory, by the Venetian police inspector and art dilettante Antonio Neu Mayr (or Neumayr) in his 1811 treatise on Italian painting and his 1836 Mazzolino pittorico, and by Giannantonio Moschini in his 1842 catalogue. The anonymous 1912 Guida del visitatore artista opened up the question to include either Raphael or some other pupil of Perugino, while Giovanni Costantini's 1916 essay on the Manfredini collection reasserted the traditional attribution with a question mark. An attribution to Bachiacca was argued by Adolfo Venturi in his monumental Storia dell’arte italiana, which was accepted by Roberto Salvini and by Berenson in the first published version of his lists. In the 1936 Italian edition, Berenson later reconsidered the problem and proposed an attribution to Domenico Puligo, to which a question mark would be subjoined in the posthumous edition of 1963. The identification has not been taken up in the literature on Puligo, including the recent catalogue raisonné of the artist's work by Elena Capretti.

Guidebooks to the collection reveal that the painting had vanished from the Seminario by the late 1960s. It seems highly possible, however, that the picture disappeared from the Pinacoteca of the Seminario as early as the Second World War, when a number of objects from the collection went missing.

== Select bibliography ==
- Louis A. Waldman, “A New Identification for the Master of the Copenhagen ‘Charity’: Bartolomeo Ghetti in Tuscany and France,” Burlington Magazine, CXLV, no. 1198 (2003), pp. 4-13.
- (Susanna Partsch, “Ghetti, Bartolomeo,” in Saur allgemeines Künstlerlexikon. Die bildenden Künstler aller Zeiten und Völker, LII, Munich (2006), p. 533.
- Louis A. Waldman, “Parigi/Firenze: Novità per il pittore fiorentino Bartolomeo Ghetti," Erba d’Arno 111 (2008), pp. 45–58.
