= Domenico Beceri =

Italian painter

Domenico Beceri (active 1527) was an Italian painter active in the Renaissance period, mainly in his hometown of Florence. He was a pupil of Domenico Puligo.
