= Lastra a Signa =

- Comune
- Comune di Lastra a Signa
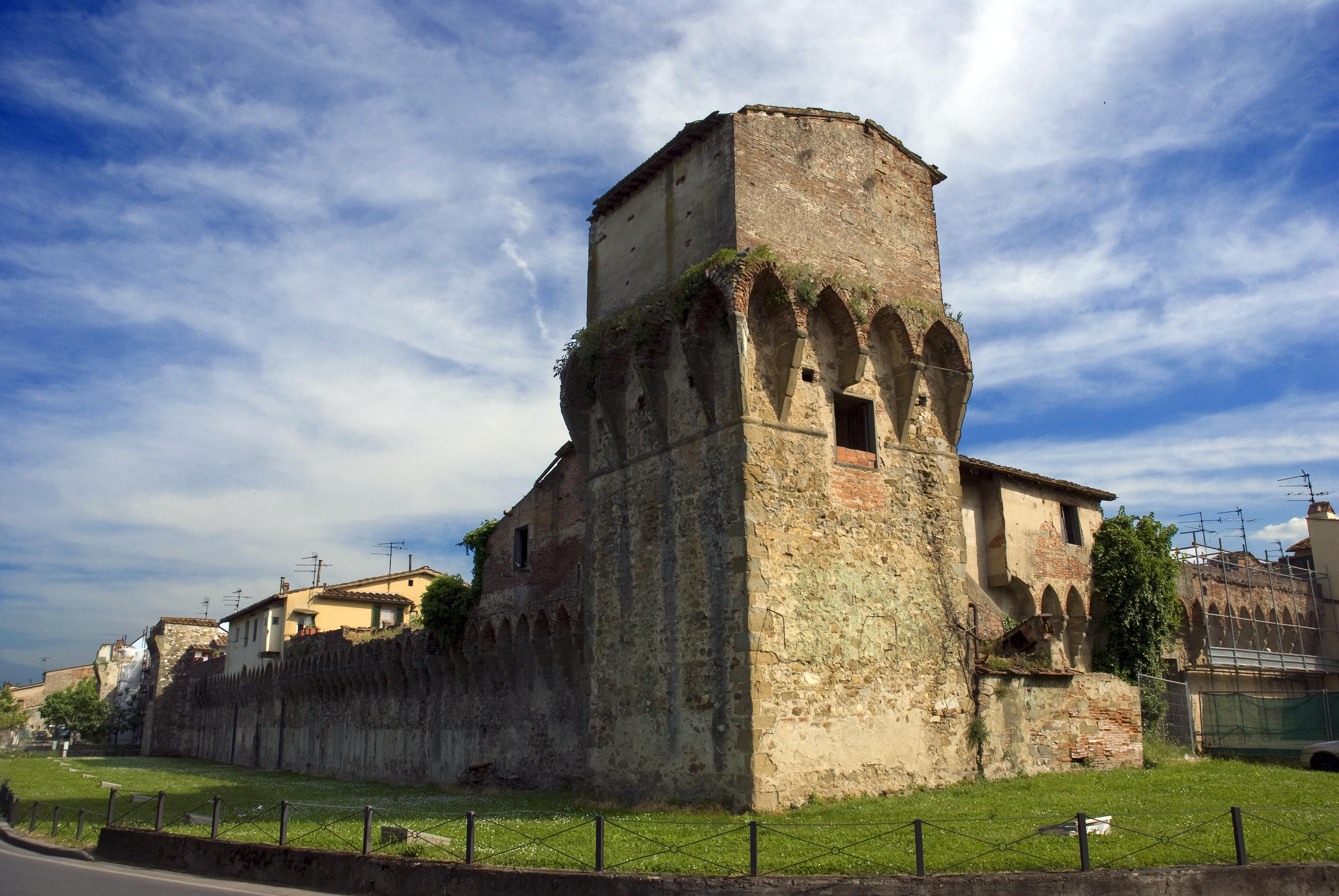
- Walls of Lastra a Signa

- Coat of arms

- Location within Italy Location within Tuscany
- Coordinates: 43°46′N 11°6′E
- Country: Italy
- Region: Tuscany
- Metropolitan city: Florence (FI)
- Frazioni: Belfiore, Bracciatica, Brucianesi, Calcinaia, Carcheri, Ginestra Fiorentina, Inno, La Lisca, La Luna, Lecceto, Malmantile, Marliano, Ponte a Signa, Ponte Torto, Porto di Mezzo, Quattro Strade, San Martino a Gangalandi, San Romolo, Sant'Ilario a Settimo, Stagno, Val di Rose.

Government
  - Mayor: Angela Bagni

Area
  - Total: 43.1 km^{2} (16.6 sq mi)
- Elevation: 36 m (118 ft)

Population (31 August 2017)
  - Total: 20,252
  - Density: 470/km^{2} (1,220/sq mi)
- Demonym: Lastrigiani
- Time zone: UTC+1 (CET)
  - Summer (DST): UTC+2 (CEST)
- Postal code: 50055
- Dialing code: 055
- Patron saint: St. Martin of Tours
- Saint day: November 11
- Website: Official website

Lastra a Signa is a comune (municipality) in the metropolitan city of Florence in the Italian region Tuscany, located about 12 kilometres (7 mi) west of Florence.

== Main sights ==
- Hospital of Sant'Antonio (1411)
- "Brunelleschi" Walls, although the attribution to the Florentine architect is uncertain
- San Martino a Gangalandi parish church and museum

== Twin towns ==
Lastra a Signa is twinned with:

- Grosio, Italy, since 1989
- Saint-Fons, France, since 1995
- Münster, Germany, since 2015
