= San Gaggio, Florence =

Roman Catholic church in Florence, Italy

Church of San Gaggio
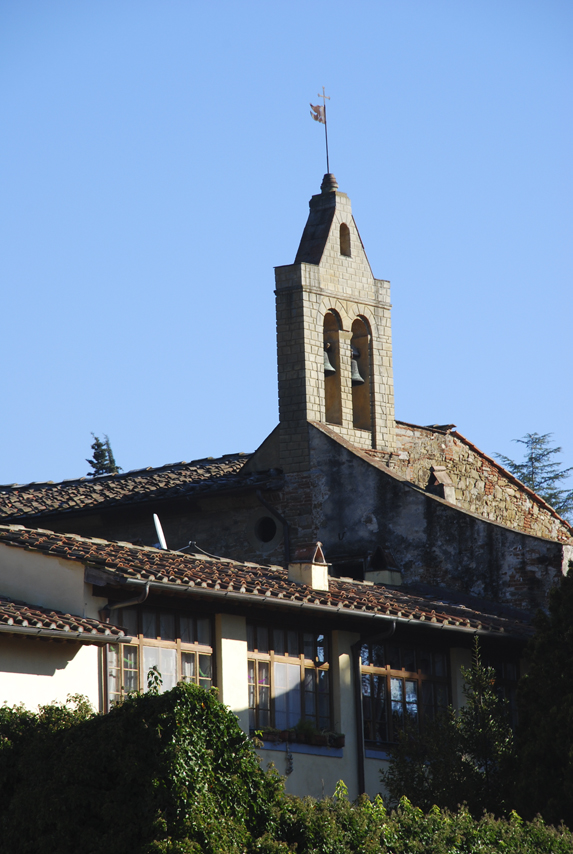
- The bell tower of the church

Religion
- Affiliation: Roman Catholic
- Province: Florence
- Rite: Roman Rite

Location
- Location: Florence, Italy
- Interactive map of Church of San Gaggio
- Coordinates: 43°45′08.27″N 11°14′22.15″E

Architecture
- Type: Church

The Church of San Gaggio (Italian: Chiesa di San Gaggio) is a Roman Catholic church located on via Senese in Florence, Italy. It was once associated with a large convent.

An early church at the site was associated with the Patarines, and demolished by the followers of St Peter Martyr. Under the patronage of Donna Nera Manieri and the Corsini family, a church at the site was founded in the mid-14th century and dedicated to St Catherine delle Ruote. In 1353, it was joined to an adjacent monastery of Santa Caterina a Monte, and dedicated to San Cajo (Saint and Pope Caius). The name was corrupted to San Gaggio. The church was subsequently heavily patronized by the Corsini family.

== Interior ==
The interior has a chapel of St Andrea Corsini (1603), frescoed by the studio of Bernardino Poccetti and housing an Annunciation with Saints by the studio of Francesco Brina. The main altar was designed by Cigoli, who painted the oval fresco of the Mystical Marriage of St Catherine and the Dispute of St Catherine. The 14th-century funeral monuments of the Corsini family, including Bartolommeo and Filippo, were moved to a chapel in the cloister of the church of Santo Spirito.
