= Gaetano Milanesi =

Italian scholar and writer on the history of art

Gaetano Milanesi (9 September 1813 – 11 March 1895) was an Italian scholar and writer on the history of art.

== Biography ==
Milanesi was born at Siena. He trained as a lawyer, but his studies in literature and history led him to spend a great deal of his time in the Biblioteca Comunale at Siena, where he obtained an appointment in 1838. There he became extraordinarily proficient in deciphering early Italian handwriting. He concentrated on documents relating to the history of art and began transcribing those he was to publish throughout his life.

In 1845 Milanesi founded the Società di Amatori delle Belle Arti with his brother Carlo Milanesi (1816–67), the Dominican father Vincenzo Marchese and Carlo Pini. Their new edition of Giorgio Vasari’s Vite dei pittori appeared between 1846 and 1870 and immediately transformed the study of the Italian Renaissance from being largely speculative to being rooted in solid foundations of documented fact. The principles of the edition arose partly from the abundance of documentation that Milanesi possessed and partly from the conviction that Vasari, however entertaining and illuminating, was fundamentally unreliable as an historian. Milanesi’s faith in 19th-century empiricism may occasionally have caused Vasari’s text to become secondary to the commentary, but the result was a documentary history of Italian art in the Renaissance of unique importance.

The first of Milanesi’s collections of transcribed documents appeared in 1854 as Documenti per la storia dell’arte senese and comprised more than 700 documents drawn particularly from the Archivio dell’Opera del Duomo at Orvieto. Further collections followed, all relating to the art of Siena and Florence, and providing the basis for all subsequent work on the Tuscan Renaissance.

Milanesi’s public career, however, was modest. He moved from Siena to Florence in 1856 to be ‘accademico residente’ in the Accademia della Crusca, in which capacity he took part in the compilation of its famous but still unfinished dictionary. Two years later was appointed Deputy Director of the Archivio di Stato in Florence, where he collected a vast body of material on the history of Italian art, not all of which is yet published. His edition of Michelangelo’s letters, published in 1875 on the quatercentenary of the artist’s birth, is particularly notable. He continued collecting documents and revising his earlier work, and a new edition of Vasari was published between 1878 and 1885. It differed in method rather than in scope from the first, and included all Vasari’s writings, corrected numerous errors, doubled the critical apparatus and incorporated many more genealogical trees. In 1883 Milanesi became Arciconsolo of the Accademia della Crusca and he ended his career as Soprintendente degli Archivi Toscani (1889–91). He retired in 1892, and died three years later.

== Works ==
Milanesi is a seminal figure in Italian Renaissance studies. His generosity towards other scholars was exemplary. His astonishing capacity for work and his meticulous attention to detail enabled him to lay the foundation of modern Italian art history.

His most important publication is his edition of Vasari's works in nine volumes, with copious and valuable notes (Florence, 1878–1885). Of his other writings the following may be mentioned:

- Il diario inedito di Alessandro Sozzini (in the Archivio storico Italiano, 1842)
- Documenti per la storia dell' arte senese, 3 vols. (Siena, 1854-1856)
- Discorsi sulla storia civile et artistica di Siena (Siena, 1862)

He also edited a number of Italian classics.

== Bibliography ==
- Sarti, Maria Giovanna (2010). "MILANESI, Gaetano". Dizionario Biografico degli Italiani (in Italian). Vol. 74: Messi–Miraglia. Rome: Istituto dell'Enciclopedia Italiana. ISBN 978-88-12-00032-6.
