= Ridolfo Ghirlandaio =

Italian painter (1483–1561)

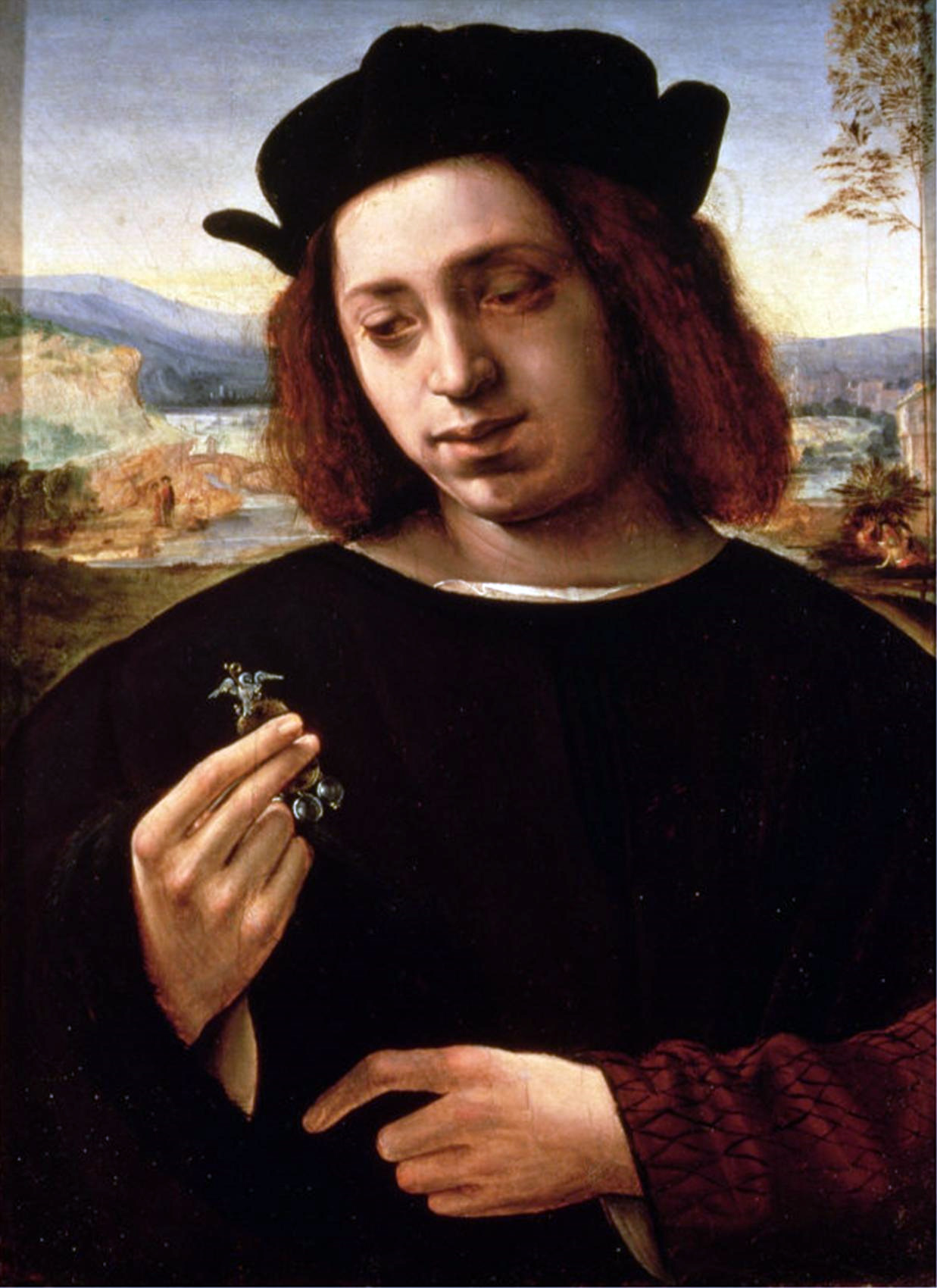
Ridolfo Ghirlandaio. Portrait of a Jeweler, circa 1505–10. Florence, Galleria Palatina di Palazzo Pitti.

Ridolfo di Domenico Bigordi, better known as Ridolfo Ghirlandaio (14 February 1483 – 6 June 1561) was an Italian Renaissance painter active mainly in Florence. He was the son of Domenico Ghirlandaio.

== Biography ==
He was born in Florence. Since he was eleven years old when his father died, Ridolfo was brought up by his uncle Davide Ghirlandaio, also a painter. Vasari states that he received further training under Fra Bartolomeo.

His works painted between 1504 and 1508 show a marked influence from Fra Bartolomeo and Raphael, with whom he was friends. Raphael asked Ridolfo to join him in Rome in 1508, but the Florentine painter stayed. In Florence, he became one of the most prominent painters of altarpieces, frescoes, and portraits, many of which survive. He was also the head of a thriving workshop whose pupils included Michele Tosini (also known as Michele di Ridolfo), Domenico Puligo, Bartolomeo Ghetti, Antonio del Ceraiolo, Toto del Nunziata, Mariano Graziadei da Pescia, Carlo Portelli and others.

Ridolfo was prominent in the execution of works for various public occasions, such as the wedding of Giuliano de' Medici, and the entry of Leo X into Florence in 1515. By 1527 he had already accumulated a handsome property, more than sufficient in maintaining the affluence of his large family of fifteen children. His sons traded in France and in Ferrara, and he himself took a part in commercial affairs. The family villa at Colle Ramole, near Florence, still has a chapel with frescoes by Ridolfo depicting the Virgin and Child with saints adored by members of the Ghirlandaio family.

In addition to painting, Ridolfo also experimented with mosaics, but it seems that only one such work, the Annunciation over the door of the Santissima Annunziata, survives today.

In his old age Ridolfo was greatly disabled by gout.

Works and details

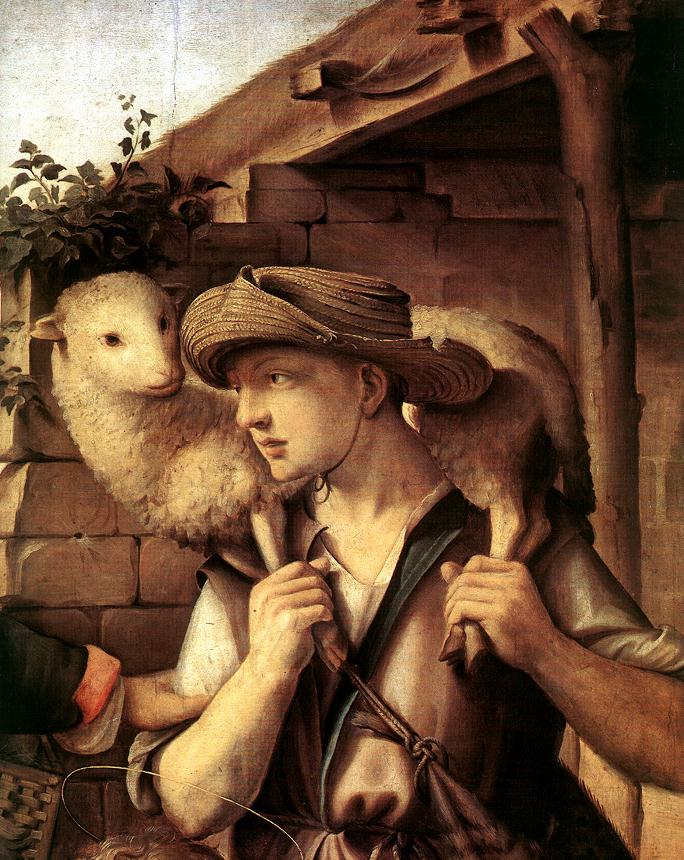
Nativity (detail), 1510. Budapest, Museum of Fine Arts.

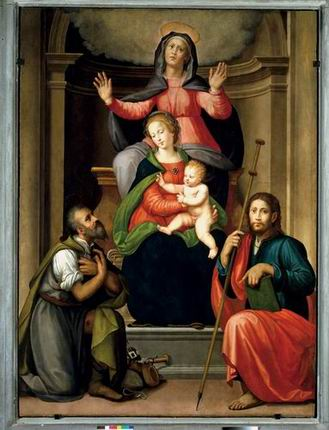
Madonna and Child with Saint Anne, and Saints Roch and James below, circa 1520. Prato, Santo Spirito.

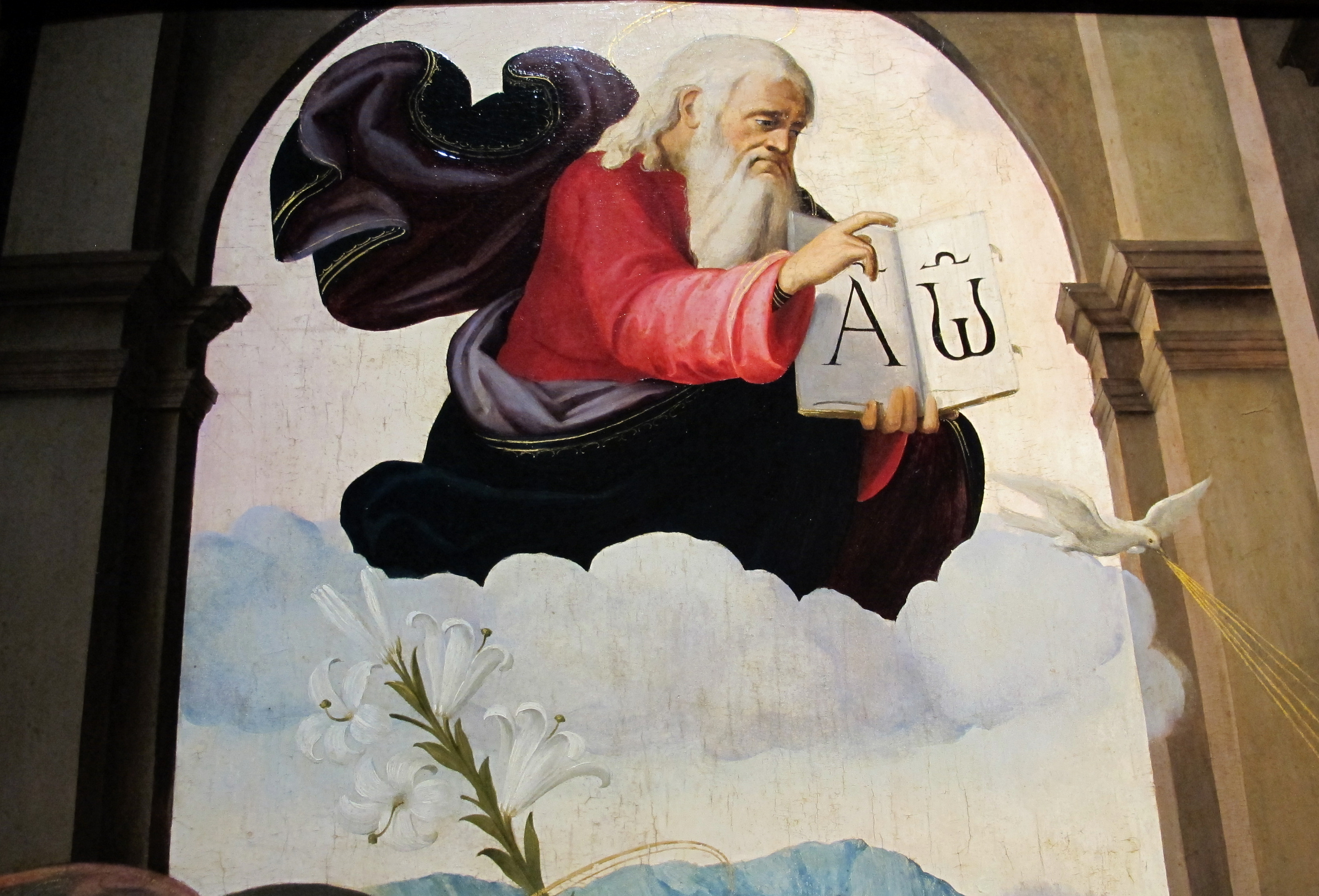
Annunciation (detail), Pieve a Pitiana (Reggello), San Pietro

== Works ==
Ridolfo's masterpieces include a number of altarpieces, including the Madonna della Cintola (1503–09) over the door of the cathedral in Prato; the Way to Calvary for the church of San Gallo, Florence (now London, National Gallery); the Coronation of the Virgin (1504), originally at San Jacopo di Ripoli, Florence, and now at the Musée du Petit Palais, Avignon; and the Nativity for the cathedral in Basel, Switzerland, and now at the Museum of Fine Arts in Budapest. For the Oratory of the Bigallo, Florence, he painted the predella (1515) to its venerated altarpiece; this predella consists of five panels representing the Nativity, Flight into Egypt, Madonna of Mercy and other subjects such as the Bigallo performing charitable burials. He painted several altarpieces for the hospital of Santa Maria Nuova, Florence, and its dependencies.

In 1514 Ridolfo completed one of his most prominent civic commissions: the frescoes in the chapel of Saint Bernard in the Palazzo Pubblico (now Palazzo Vecchio), Florence. These include images of the Trinity surrounded by the heads of the twelve apostles and other accessories, a lunette of the Annunciation and another with the Vision of Saint Bernard.

In 1517 he painted two large panels of Saint Zenobius Resuscitating a Child and the Translation of the Body of Saint Zenobius. These panels, now at the Galleria dell'Accademia in Florence, originally flanked a large Annunciation by Mariotto Albertinelli, now also at the Accademia.

Later works include the Assumption of the Virgin (1519–24) for Santa Maria dei Battillani, Florence (now Berlin, Gemäldegalerie), which includes a self portrait; a Pietà (1521) for Sant'Agostino, Colle di Val d'Elsa; and the Madonna and Child with Saints (1528) for at San Pietro Maggiore in Pistoia. He painted a portrait of a young Cosimo I de' Medici, future Grand-Duke, now in the Uffizi. In 1543 he completed a series of frescoes in the monastery of Santa Maria degli Angeli, Florence. Many of his last works were finished or realized entirely by his pupil and heir, Michele Tosini, also called Michele di Ridolfo del Ghirlandaio on account of his close relationship with Ridolfo.

His portraits include fine examples at the Art Institute of Chicago, the Galleria Palatina in Florence, the Dunedin Public Art Gallery, the Museo Thyssen Bornemisza in Madrid and the Minneapolis Institute of Arts, among others.

Among his small-scale devotional works is the Adoration by the Shepherds at the Raclin Murphy Museum of Art at Notre Dame University, Indiana, and a small triptych of the same subject at the Metropolitan Museum of Art, New York.

Portraits

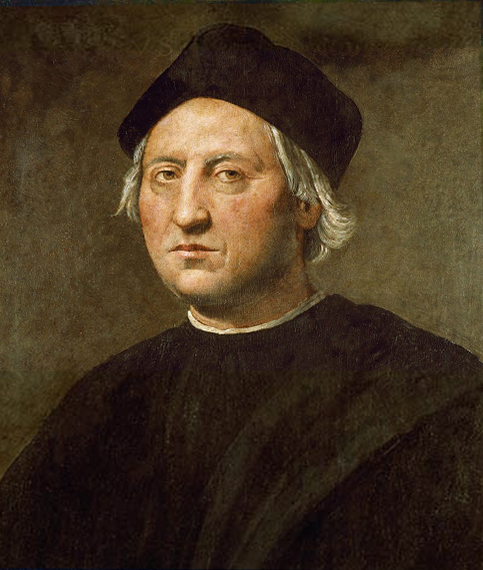
Portrait of Columbus. Pegli (Genoa), Museo Navale.

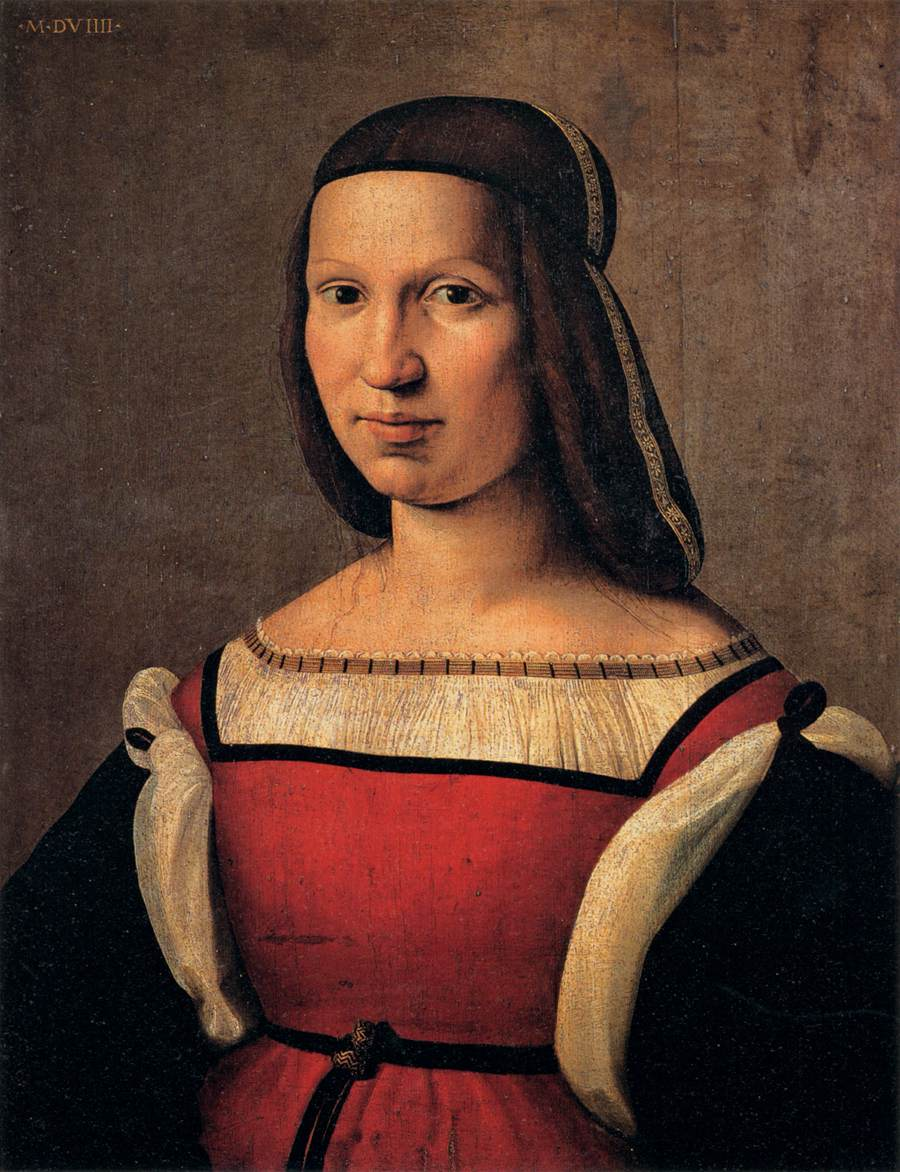
Portrait of a Lady. Florence, Galleria Palatina.

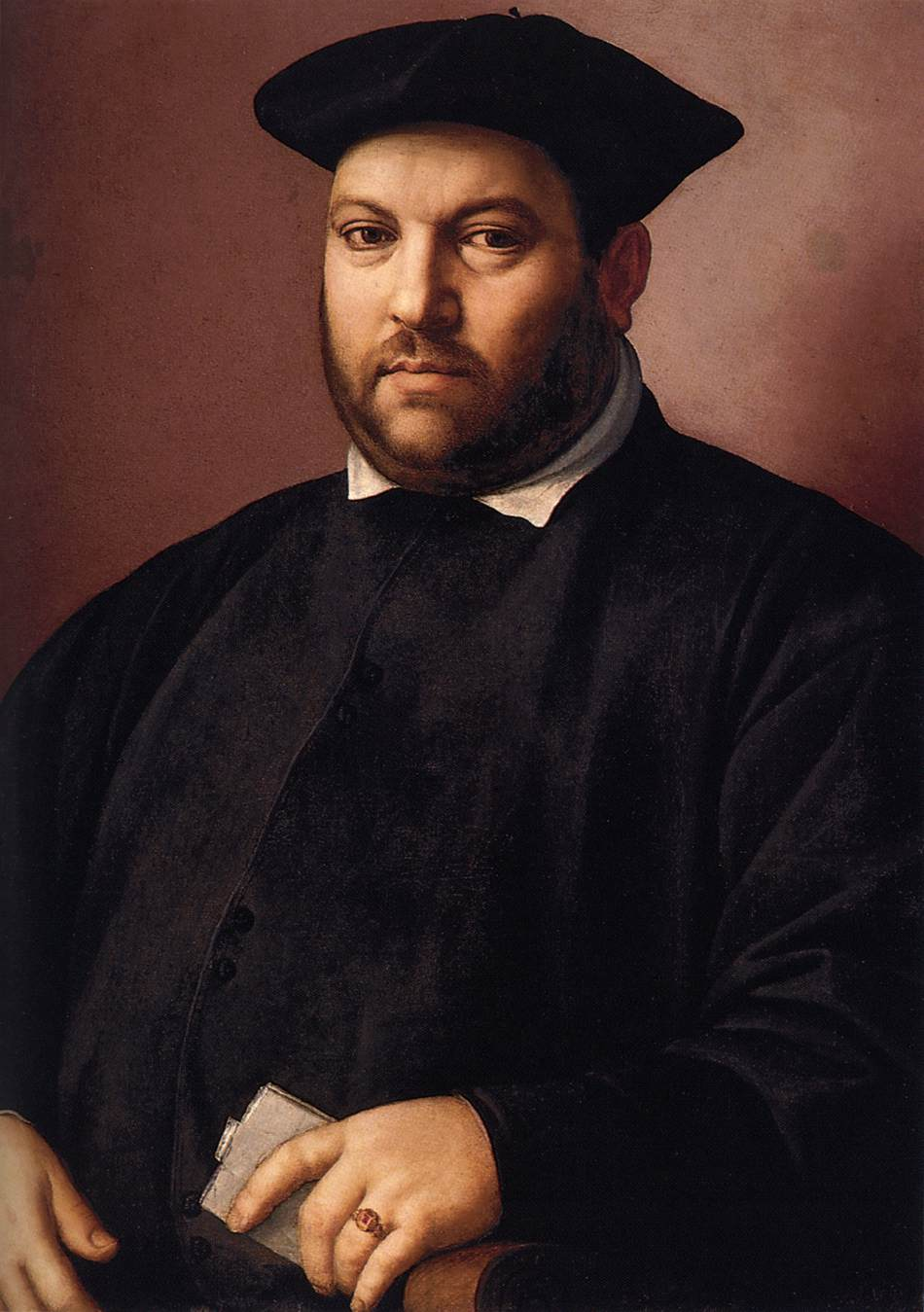
Portrait of a Man. Madrid, Museo Thyssen Bornemisza.

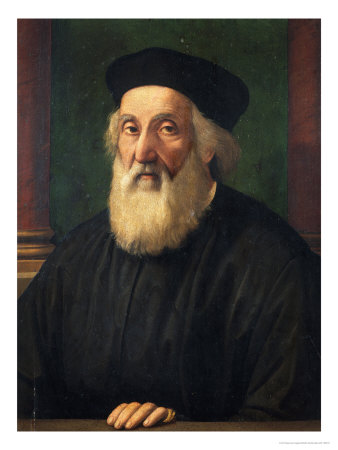
Portrait of Baldo Magni. Prato, Museo di Palazzo Pretorio.

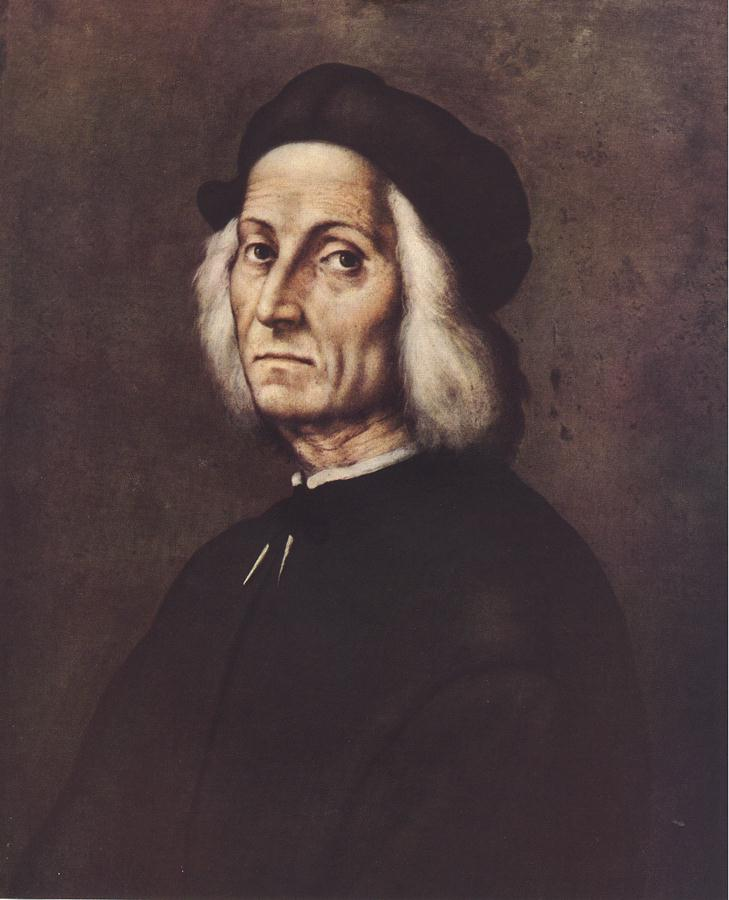
Portrait of a Man. Saint Petersburg, State Hermitage Museum.
