= Antonio del Ceraiolo =

Italian painter

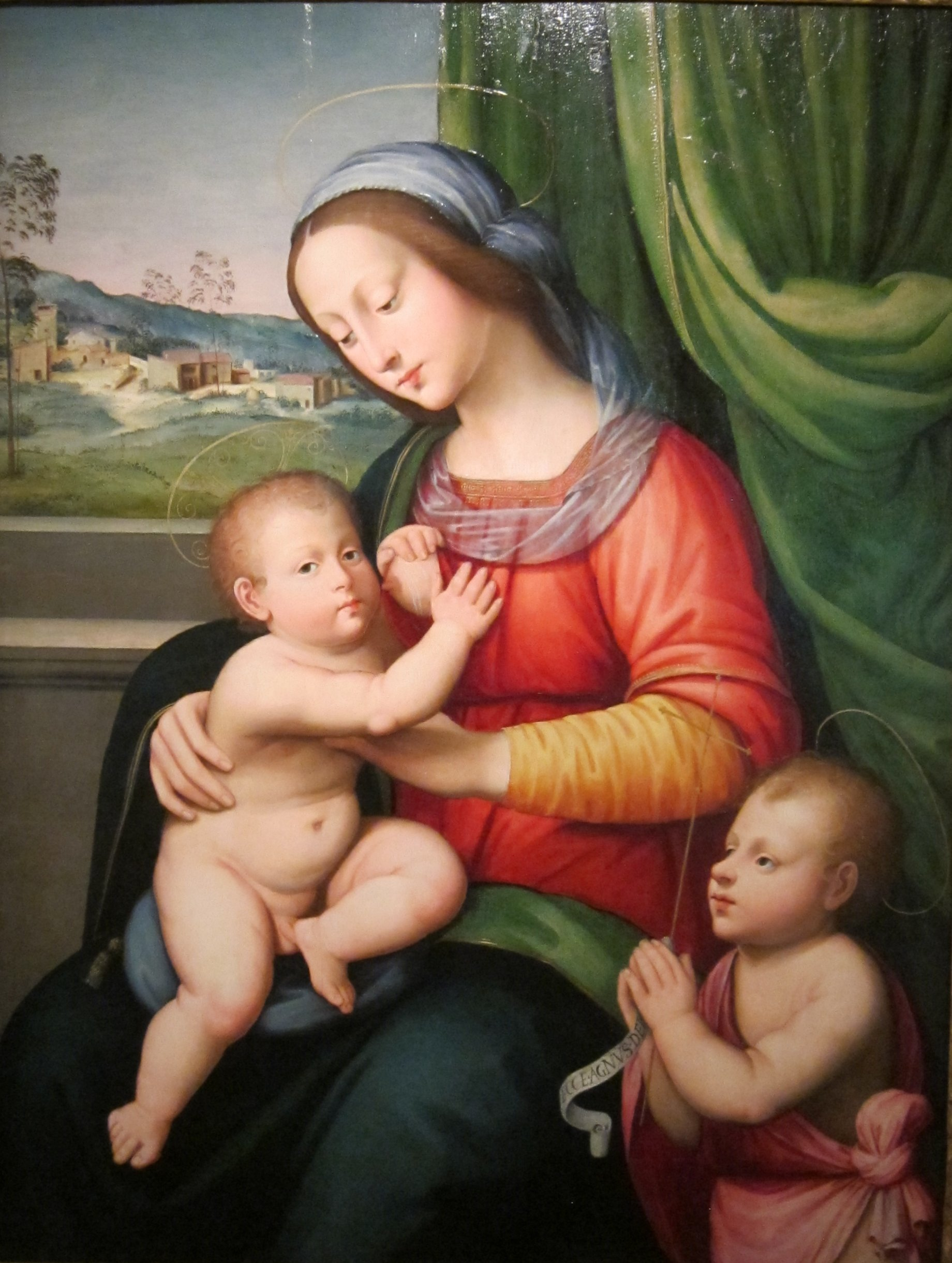
Madonna and Child with Infant St. John the Baptist, circa 1520. Cincinnati Art Museum.

Antonio del Ceraiolo, also known as Antonio di Arcangelo (the nickname "Ceraiolo" derives from the profession of his father, a ceraiolo, or candle maker), was an Italian Renaissance painter active in his native Florence between 1518 and 1538. According to Giorgio Vasari, Ceraiolo was a pupil first of Lorenzo di Credi and then of Ridolfo Ghirlandaio, in whose biography he is mentioned. Vasari singled out Ceraiolo's abilities as a portraitist and mentioned two of his altarpieces, both of which survive at the Museo del Cenacolo di San Salvi, Florence. The first of these is a Crucifixion with Saints Francis and Mary Magdalen, originally in the church of San Jacopo tra' i fossi; the second a Saint Michael for the basilica of the Santissima Annunziata.

Most of Ceraiolo's paintings are half-length images of the Madonna and Child, usually with the young Saint John the Baptist, Florence's patron saint.
