= Artists of the Tudor court =

Painters and limners engaged by the Tudor dynasty between 1485 and 1603

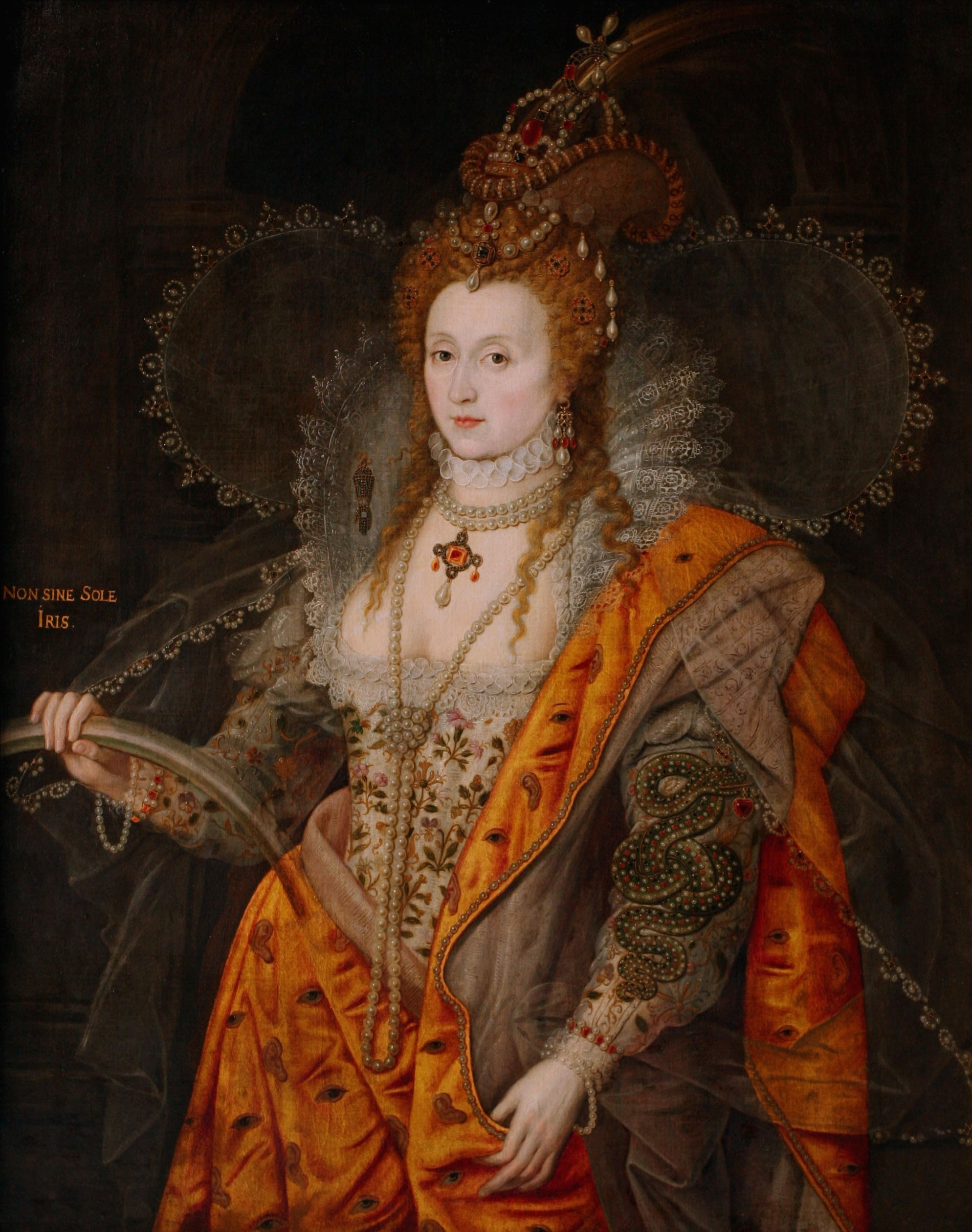
The Rainbow Portrait by an unknown artist, possibly Marcus Gheeraerts the Younger, an image of Elizabeth I as the "Queen of Love and Beauty" c. 1600, epitomizes the elaborate iconography associated with later Tudor court portraiture.

The artists of the Tudor court are the painters and limners engaged by the monarchs of England's Tudor dynasty and their courtiers between 1485 and 1603, from the reign of Henry VII to the death of Elizabeth I.

Typically managing a group of assistants and apprentices in a workshop or studio, many of these artists produced works across several disciplines, including portrait miniatures, large-scale panel portraits on wood, illuminated manuscripts, heraldric emblems, and elaborate decorative schemes for masques, tournaments, and other events.

Although there were English artists throughout the period, many artists were foreigners, especially from the Low Countries, but also from Italy and Germany. Some only stayed for short periods, but many for several years or the rest of their lives.

== Isolation and iconography ==
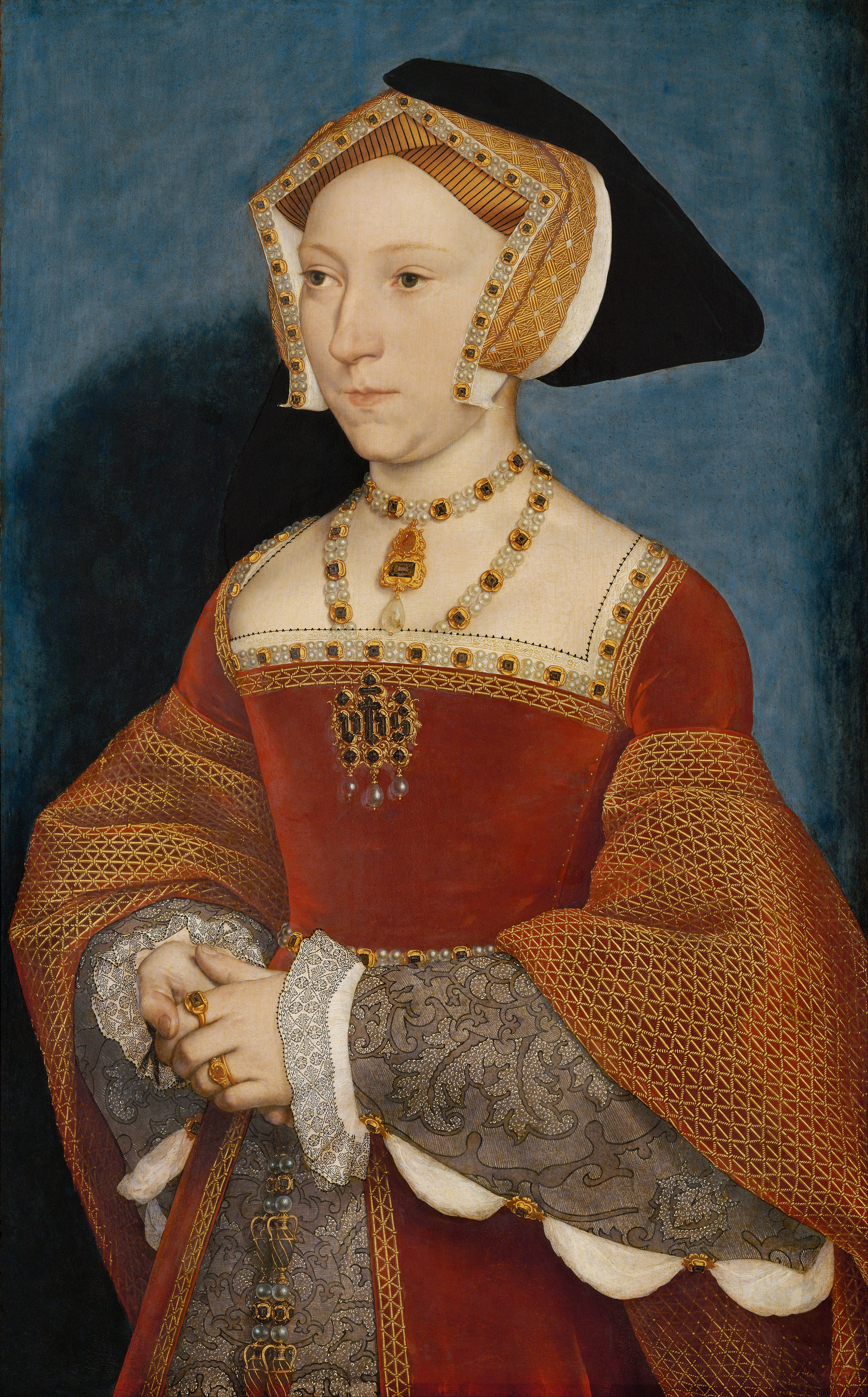
Portrait of Jane Seymour by Holbein, 1536–37

The Tudor period was one of unusual isolation from European trends for England. At the start the Wars of the Roses had greatly disrupted artistic activity, which apart from architecture had reached a very low ebb by 1485. The Yorkist dynasty overthrown by the Tudors had been very close to their Burgundian allies, and English diplomats had their portraits painted by the finest Early Netherlandish painters – Edward Grimston by Petrus Christus and Sir John Donne by Hans Memling (both National Gallery, London (Note: The Grimston on loan. Grimston was a Lancastrian, or at least Henry VI of England's agent before the Wars of the Roses began, Donne a Yorkist.)). However these were both painted abroad. In the Tudor period foreign artists were recruited and often welcomed lavishly by the English court, as they were in other artistically marginal parts of Europe like Spain or Naples. The Netherlandish painters remained predominant, though French influence was also important on both Lucas Horenbout and Nicholas Hilliard, respectively the founder and the greatest exponent of the distinctively English tradition of the portrait miniature.

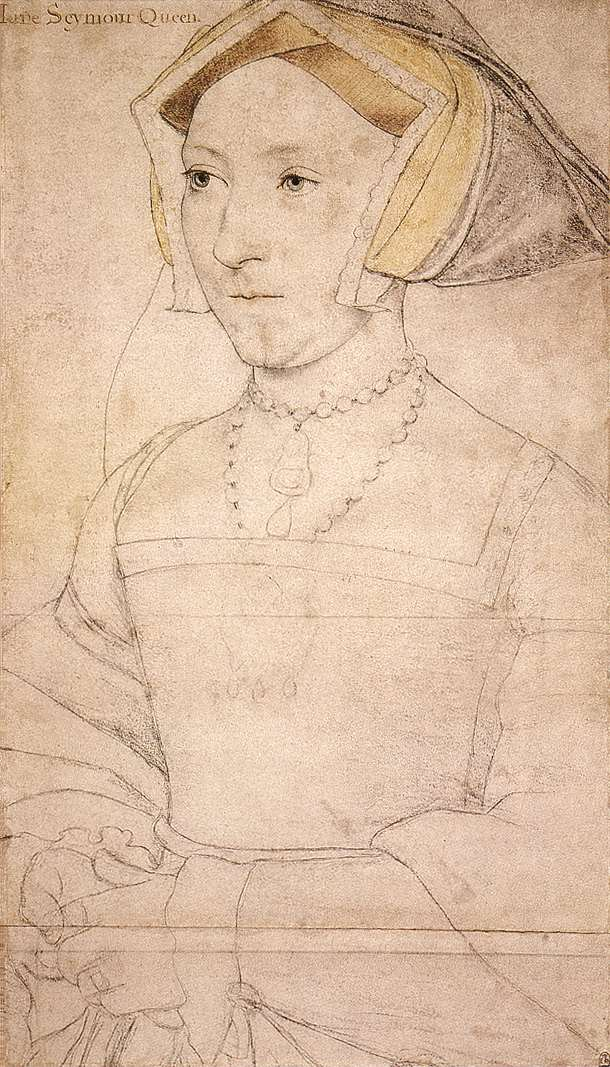
Drawing of Jane Seymour by Holbein, 1536–37

With the virtual extinction of religious painting at the Reformation, and little interest in classical mythology until the very end of the period, the portrait was the most important form of painting for all the artists of the Tudor court, and the only one to have survived in any numbers. How many of these have also been lost can be seen from Holbein's book (nearly all pages in the Royal Collection) containing preparatory drawings for portraits – of eighty-five drawings, only a handful have surviving Holbein paintings, though often copies have survived. Portraiture ranged from the informal miniature, almost invariably painted from life in the course of a few days and intended for private contemplation, to the later large-scale portraits of Elizabeth I such as the Rainbow Portrait, filled with symbolic iconography in dress, jewels, background, and inscription.

Much energy was also expended on decorative painting of fixtures and fittings, often of a very temporary nature. In theory the "Serjeant Painters" of the king, a lower rank of painter, did most of this, probably to the designs of the more elevated "King's Painters" (or Queen's), but it is clear that they too spent time on this, as did court artists all over Europe (see Royal Entry). There was also the Master of the Revels, whose Office was responsible for festivals and tournaments, and no doubt called upon the artists and Serjeant Painters for assistance.

Jewellery and metalwork were regarded as extremely important, and far more was spent on them than on painting. Holbein produced many spectacular designs for now-vanished table ornaments in precious metals, and Hilliard was also a practising goldsmith. The main artistic interests of Henry VIII were music, building palaces and tapestry, of which he had over 2,000 pieces, costing far more than he ever spent on painters. The Flemish set of The Story of Abraham still at Hampton Court Palace is one grand set from late in his reign.

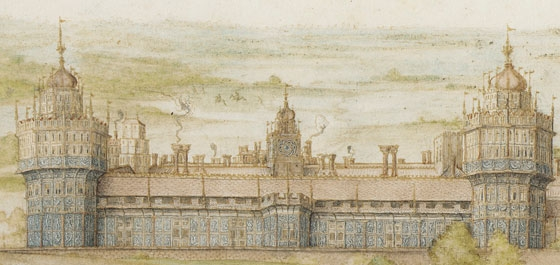
Detail of Georg Hoefnagel's 1568 watercolour of the south frontage of Nonsuch Palace, one of the only two good images - which differ considerably. The stucco reliefs are shown in blue-ish grey.

Elizabeth spent far less, hardly building anything herself, but took a personal interest in painting, keeping her own collection of miniatures locked away, wrapped in paper on which she wrote the names of the sitter. She is reputed to have had paintings of her burnt that did not match the iconic image she wished to be shown.

The most progressive and spectacular palace of the Tudor period, Nonsuch Palace, begun by Henry VIII in 1538 a little way south of London, was covered inside and out with prodigious quantities of figurative sculpted stucco reliefs – the whole scheme covered over 2,000 square metres (21,000 sq ft). There was also probably much decorative painting. As for the similar work at the Palace of Fontainebleau, which Nonsuch was certainly intended to compete with, and outshine, Italians were brought in to provide authentic Mannerist work, however much the general plan remains English. The scattered fragments and images that have survived suggest that the awestruck accounts of visitors were not exaggerated.

== Community of artists ==
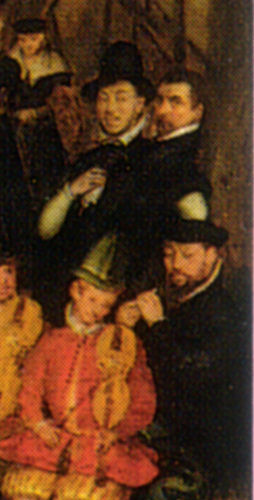
Exiled Flemish artists in England? (Note: Strong 1969 suggests that Hoefnagel and fellow Flemish exiles are sitting beneath the tree. Town 2015 reattributes the painting to Gheeraerts the Elder, but the figures may represent him and his circle.) Detail of A Fête at Bermondsey.

Many of the artists active at the Tudor court were connected by ties of family, marriage, and training. Lucas Horenbout (often called Hornebolt in England), who began painting and illuminating for Henry VIII in the mid-1520s, was accompanied in his workshop by his sister Susannah, who was also an illuminator. It is generally accepted (Note: Karel van Mander says Holbein was taught the art by a "Master Lucas", and there is a miniature of Holbein by Horenbout.) that Lucas Horenbout taught Hans Holbein the Younger the techniques of painting miniatures on vellum when Holbein was engaged by Henry VIII in the early 1530s.

Lucas and Susanna Horenbout's father, Gerard Horenbout – possibly he was the Master of James IV of Scotland – was an active member of the Ghent-Bruges school of manuscript illustrators and also was employed briefly at the Tudor court. In Bruges, Gerard was associated with Sanders Bening or Benninck and his son Simon, with whom he worked on the illustrations for the Grimani Breviary. Simon Bening's eldest daughter Levina Teerlinc was also trained as an illuminator. She entered the service of Henry VIII at the close of 1546 following the deaths of Holbein (1543) and Lucas Horenbout (1544), and would remain as court painter to Henry's son Edward VI and as painter and lady-in-waiting to both his daughters, Mary I and Elizabeth. Levina Teerlinc, in turn, taught the art of limning to Nicholas Hilliard, an apprentice goldsmith who would marry the daughter of Queen Elizabeth's jeweller and rise to become the supreme miniaturist of the age. John Bettes the Elder apprenticed his son, John the Younger to Hilliard. Hilliard's most famous student, Isaac Oliver, later limner to Anne of Denmark and Henry Frederick, Prince of Wales, was married to the niece of Marcus Gheeraerts the Younger. Gheeraerts was also the brother-in-law of Lucas de Heere's apprentice John de Critz the Elder, who took the dynasty into the Stuart period, and was succeeded as Serjeant-Painter by his son. De Heere was also a religious refugee from Flanders; although the upheavals of the Protestant Reformation acted to reduce artistic contacts, especially with Italy, England could also benefit from them.

=== Residents ===
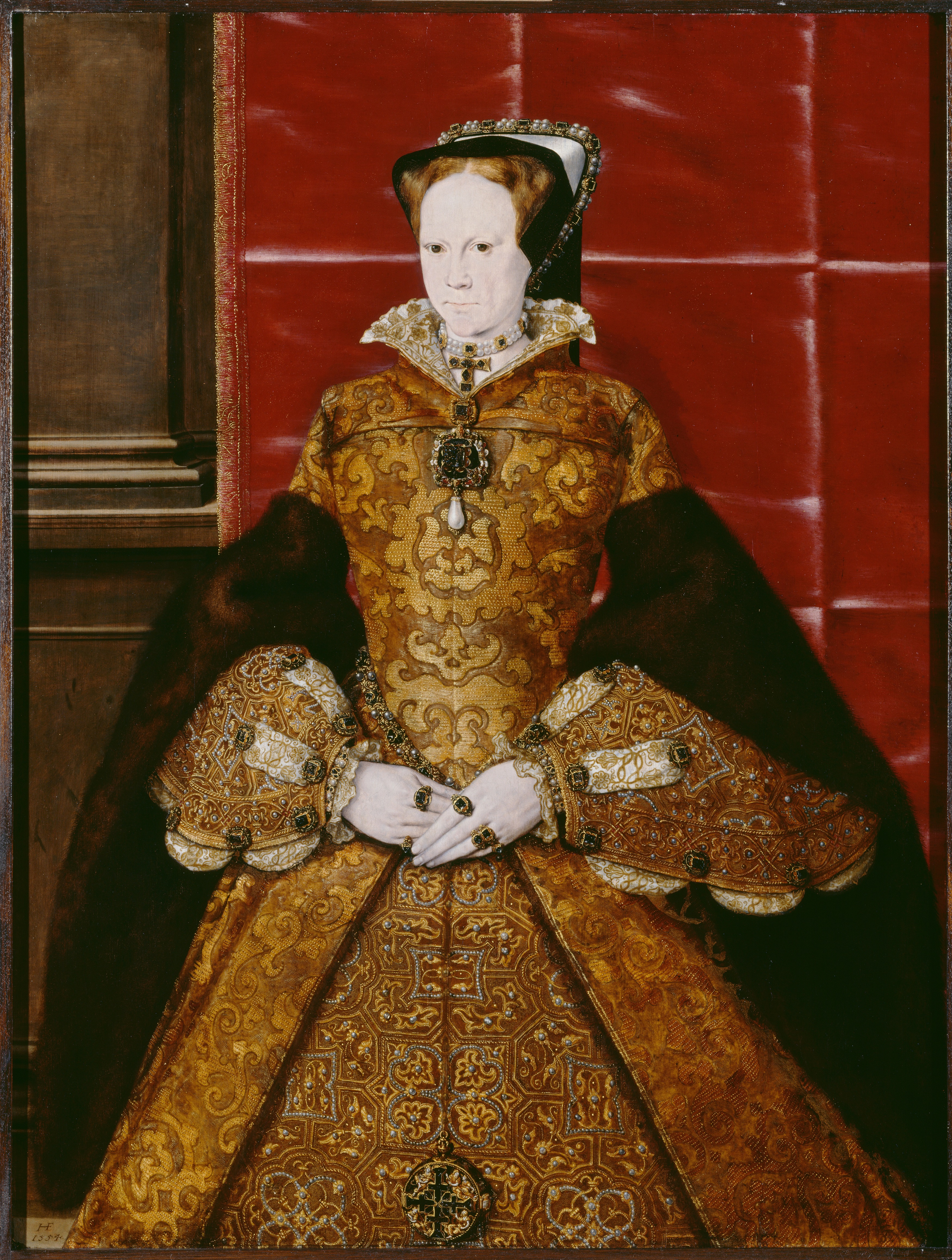
Mary I by Hans Eworth, c. 1555

- Meynnart Wewyck (Maynard Vewicke), resident ca. 1502–1525, painter of "pictours" or panel portraits to both Henry VII and Henry VIII.
- Lucas Horenbout, pioneer of the portrait miniature, King's Painter from 1531 until his death in 1544.
- Anthony Toto and Bartolommeo Penni.
- Hans Holbein the Younger, spent many years on two visits, painting the best portraits of the Tudor period.
- Levina Teerlinc, miniaturist and lady-in-waiting.
- John Bettes the Elder, engaged for decorative work at Whitehall from 1531 to 1533; also a portrait-painter and miniaturist.
- Gerlach Flicke, or "Garlicke" in some English records, German portraitist, in London from c. 1545 until his death in 1558.
- Hans Eworth, in England from c. 1549; portrait-painter and recorded as a designer for the Office of the Revels.
- Steven van Herwijck, portrait medallist, visited 1562, resident 1565 until his death in 1567.
- Steven van der Meulen, arrived by 1561, naturalized 1562, active until his death in 1563.
- Marcus Gheeraerts the Younger, Flemish Protestant refugee portraitist, who arrived as a child.
- George Gower, English portraitist. (Note: A major reassessment of Gower's career as a portraitist was published in The Burlington Magazine in September 2020 (Town 2020).)
- Nicholas Hilliard, miniaturist and goldsmith to Elizabeth I from c. 1572.
- Hieronimo Custodis, Flemish exile portraitist active from 1589 until his death in 1593.
- Sir William Segar, portraitist and herald; later Garter Principal King of Arms 1607–1633.
- John de Critz the Elder, arrived from Flanders as a child, portraitist.
- Robert Peake the Elder, English portraitist; also employed by the Office of the Revels; later serjeant painter under James I.
- Isaac Oliver, Hilliard's pupil and later rival.
- Rowland Lockey, another apprentice of Hilliard.

=== Visitors ===
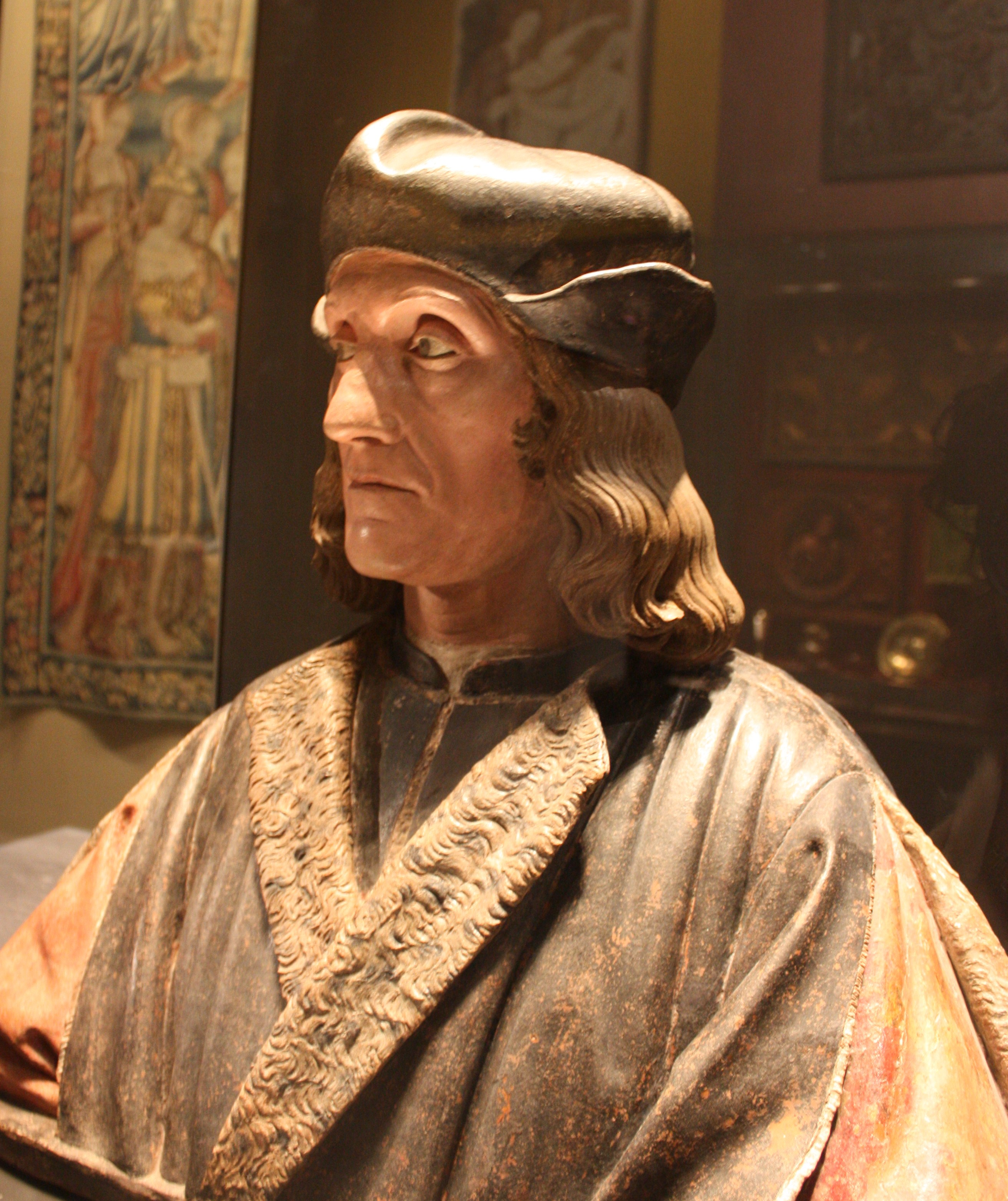
Posthumous terracotta bust of Henry VII by Pietro Torrigiano

- Pietro Torrigiano, Florentine sculptor, on the run after breaking Michelangelo's nose, made Henry VII's tomb and other monuments in an extended stay. With Mazzoni, a rare portrait sculptor at the Tudor court.
- Possibly Guido Mazzoni, Florentine sculptor mostly in painted terracotta. He submitted alternative designs for Henry's tomb, and a painted terracotta bust by him may be of Henry VIII as a boy. (Note: Royal Collection. Mazzoni was working on the tomb of Charles VIII of France in Paris, and may have made a visit in connection with the tomb.)
- Michael Sittow probably painted Henry VII and a picture of Catherine of Aragon for her mother, his employer
- Possibly the Venetian Antonio Solario, who certainly painted an altarpiece for a London merchant in 1514
- Girolamo da Treviso, hired mainly as a military engineer (who died in action), but also left a significant painting
- Niccolo da Modena or Nicolas Bellin, brought in from Fontainebleau for Nonsuch Palace
- Lucas Cornelisz. de Cock (Note: His names are confusing. His father was the painter Cornelis Engebrechtsz. ("z." = "zoon" or son of). He is known as Lucas Cornelis Engebrechtsz., Lucas Cornelis de Kok, Lucas Cornelis Kunst, and several variants and permutations, even before contemporary English and Italian attempts are involved. Getty Union Name List. He is mentioned by Karel van Mander.) (1495–1552) Dutch portrait and history painter, probably in England c. 1527–1532, before leaving for Italy
- William or Guillim Scrots, employed by Henry VIII from at least 1545 and retained by Edward VI until the King died in 1553
- Antonis Mor or Antonio Moro, the Habsburg portraitist, visited with Philip II of Spain
- Marcus Gheeraerts the Elder a Flemish Protestant refugee, stayed nine years, and returned in 1585 until his death sometime before 1589
- Quentin Metsys the Younger or Massys
- Cornelis Ketel stayed eight years, painting histories and portraits
- Lucas de Heere Protestant refugee who returned to Flanders after ten years, when it was safe to do so
- Joris Hoefnagel, in England c. 1569–71 making drawings for Civitates Orbis Terrarum; painted A Fête at Bermondsey while in England
- Federico Zuccari visited for six months, painting Elizabeth and Robert Dudley, 1st Earl of Leicester

== Serjeant Painters ==
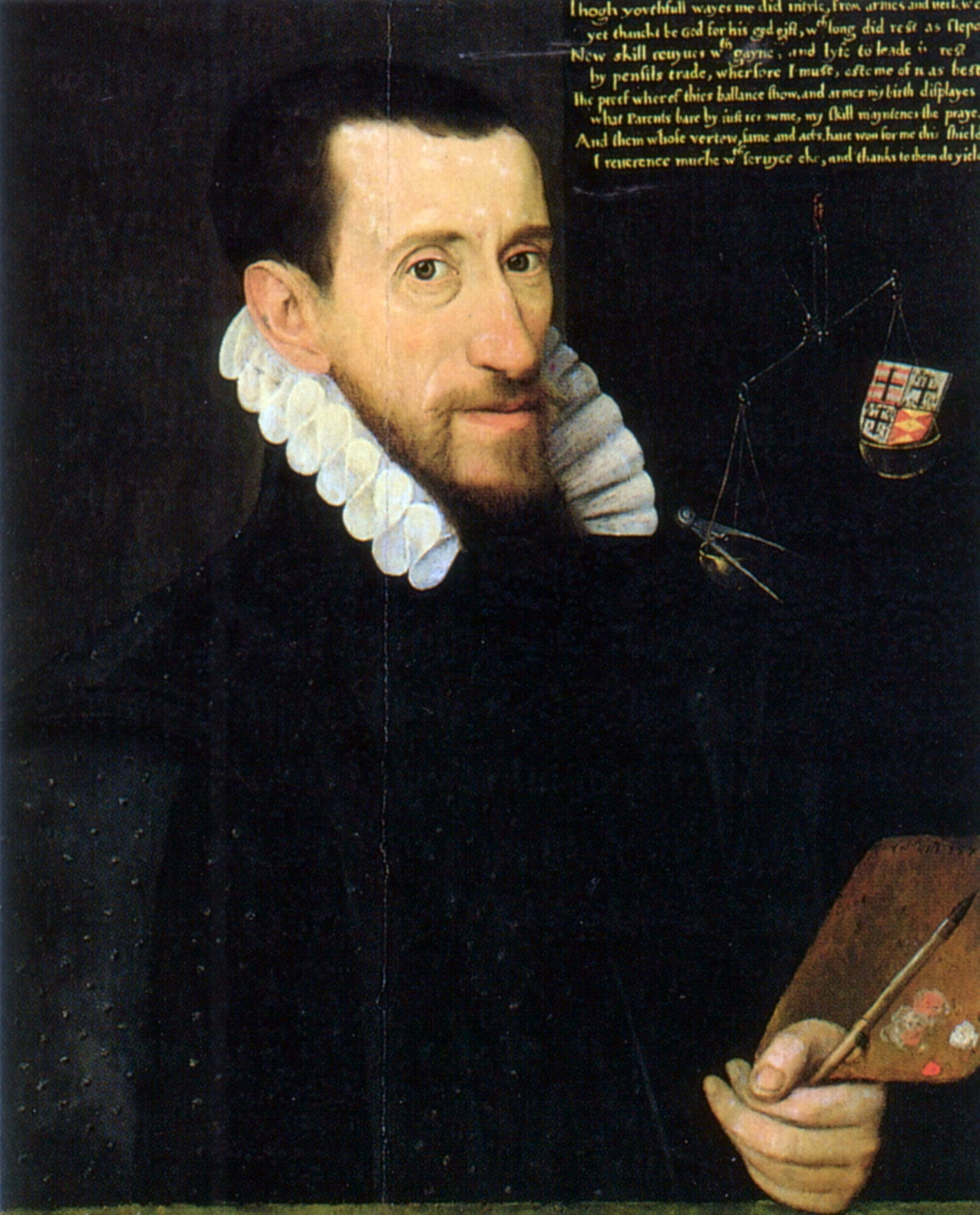
George Gower's 1579 self-portrait shows his tools as an artist outweighing his arms as a gentleman; he was the first serjeant painter who was also a portraitist

The holders of the office were:

- John Browne, heraldic painter since 1502, appointed "King's Painter" in 1511/12, and as the first Serjeant Painter in 1527, when the imported artist Lucas Horenbout took over as "King's Painter" - now the superior position. Browne died in office in December 1532.
- Andrew Wright, 1532–1544, about whom little is known
- "Antony Toto", really Antonio di Nunziato d'Antonio, a Florentine pupil of Ridolfo Ghirlandaio, from 1544, who died in office in 1554. He was the first Serjeant Painter who can be evidenced as an artist rather than an artisan. None of his paintings are known to survive, but his New Year gifts to Henry, presumably his own work, are documented as including a Calumny of Apelles (1538/39) and a Story of King Alexander (1540/41), and then in 1552 a portrait of a duke "steyned upon cloth of silver" for Edward VI. He had a Florentine colleague Bartolommeo Penni, brother of the much more distinguished Gianfrancesco, Raphael's right-hand man, and Luca, a member of the School of Fontainebleau. Both probably came to Henry from Cardinal Wolsey, as they first appear in the accounts just after Wolsey's fall in October 1529. "Toto" had been signed on in Florence in 1519 as an assistant to Pietro Torrigiano, who in fact left England for good later that year. Toto and Penni spent most of their time after 1538 working on Nonsuch Palace, including elaborate stucco work for Henry's most advanced building, now vanished.
- Nicolas Lizard (or Lisory), a French artist, held the post from 1554 to his death in 1571
- William Herne or Heron, 1572 to 1580
- George Gower 1581 until his death in 1596
- Leonard Fryer 1596–1607, about whom very little is known, joined after the death of Elizabeth by
- John de Critz the Elder from 1603.

== Identification and attribution ==
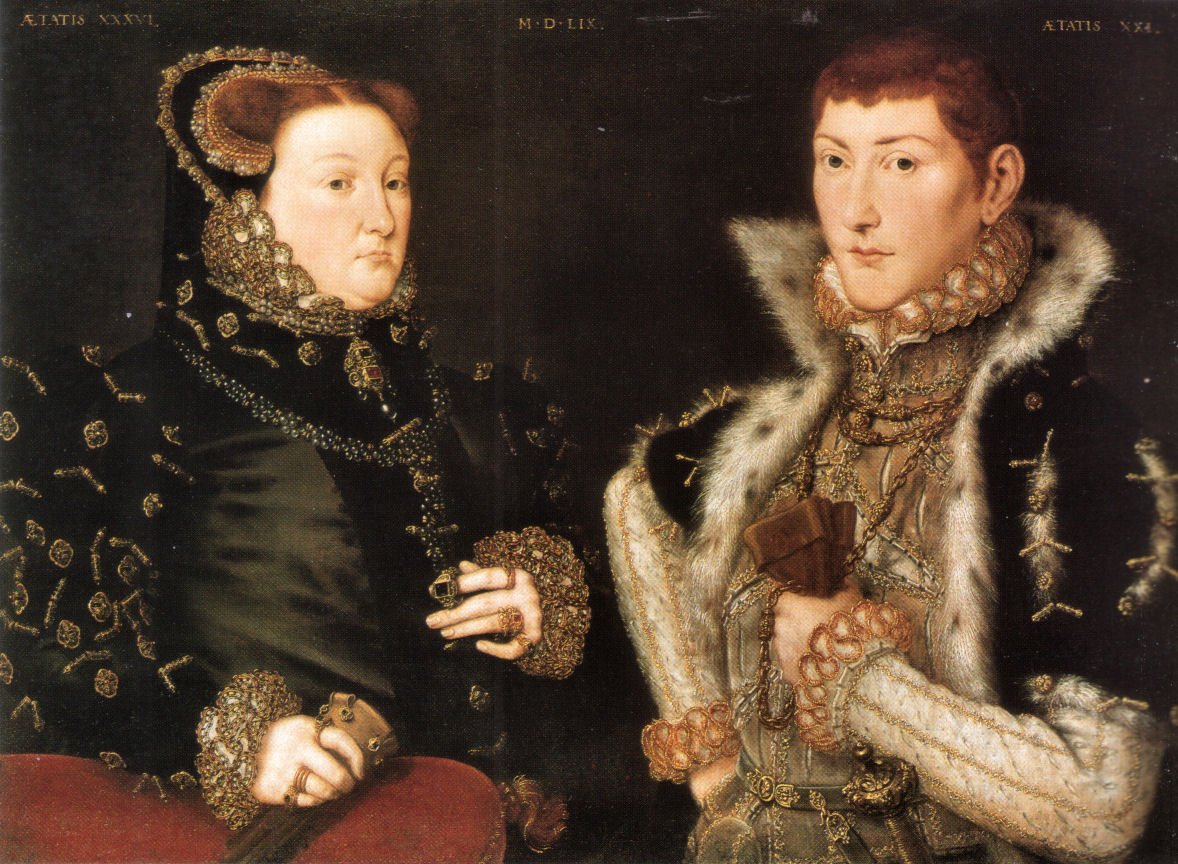
This portrait was misidentified for 250 years.

Many surviving images have been badly worn over the years, or incompetently "restored". Inscriptions are often later than the paintings themselves, and may reflect wishful thinking; many anonymous Tudor ladies were identified as "Mary I", or, especially, one or other of Henry VIII's queens, by the owners of pictures. Anne Boleyn in particular has been said to be the subject of dozens of pictures; even now there is no certain image of her done from life, and the most plausible, is a later copy and among the least informative. The only probable portrait of Catherine Howard, a miniature by Holbein in the Royal Collection, is only identified by circumstantial evidence (see Gallery). (Note: Strong is persuaded for various reasons: two Holbein versions exist (Royal Collection, Windsor & Duke of Buccleuch), which is only known for queens among female sitters for Tudor miniatures; she wears the same jewel as Jane Seymour in the Vienna Holbein (shown above); the pearls may tie in with a gift to Catherine from Henry in 1540, and she is the only queen to fit. There are no other plausible likenesses of her to compare to. Both versions have long been known as of Catherine Howard. This is the Windsor version, considered the original done from life.)

A well-known painting (left) was identified by George Vertue in 1727 as Lady Frances Brandon and her second husband Adrian Stokes, an attribution that stood unquestioned until the sitters were properly identified as Mary Nevill, Baroness Dacre and her son Gregory Fiennes, 10th Baron Dacre and the artist as Hans Eworth in 1986.

Attribution to artists is even more challenging; not all artists signed their work, and those who did may not have done so consistently. Many pictures have been cut down, extended, or otherwise altered in ways that damage or destroy inscriptions. Artists' workshops often churned out copies of the master's work to meet the demand for portraits, as symbols of devotion to the Crown or simply to populate the fashionable "long galleries" lined with portraits.

Today, attributions are made on the basis of style, sitter, accepted date, and related documentation such as receipts or bills for payment and inventories of collections or estates. It is now generally accepted that the artist known as "The Monogrammist HE" is Hans Eworth, but other identifications remain elusive. Some of the most well-known images of the period, such as the portrait of Elizabeth I when a Princess, age 13, have been attributed to many artists over the years, but remain cautiously labelled "?Flemish School" in recent catalogues. Much scholarly debate also circles around identification of possible portraits of Lady Jane Grey. (Note: See "Is this the true face of Lady Jane?" - article from The Guardian, 16 January 2006, describing a portrait (found in a South London home) that purportedly depicts Lady Jane Grey, and discussion of two portraits identified in 2005 as depicting Lady Jane at SomeGreyMatter.)

== Payments ==
The royal accounts for the period survive, but are not always easy to interpret. Payments often covered expensive materials, and in many cases the wages of assistants had to be paid out of them. Some regular annuities, usually supplemented by payments for specific works, are given below. But recipients were expected to give works to the monarch, at New Year or on their birthday.

Royal annuities:

- Meynnart Wewyck (as "olde maynerd wewoke paynter"), half-yearly payment of 100 shillings in 1525
- Lucas Hornebolte (scholarly dissention) £33 6s or £62 10s from 1525 "until his death"
- Hans Holbein £30 (but he did more work outside the court)
- Levina Teerlinc £40
- Nicholas Hilliard received £400 as a gift in 1591, and an annuity of £40 from 1599; he typically charged £3 for a non-royal miniature.

The sums spent on metalwork, building palaces, and by Henry on tapestries, dwarfed these figures.

== Galleries ==
=== Miniatures ===
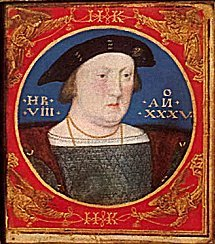
Lucas Horenbout, Manuscript portrait of Henry VIII, 1525–26

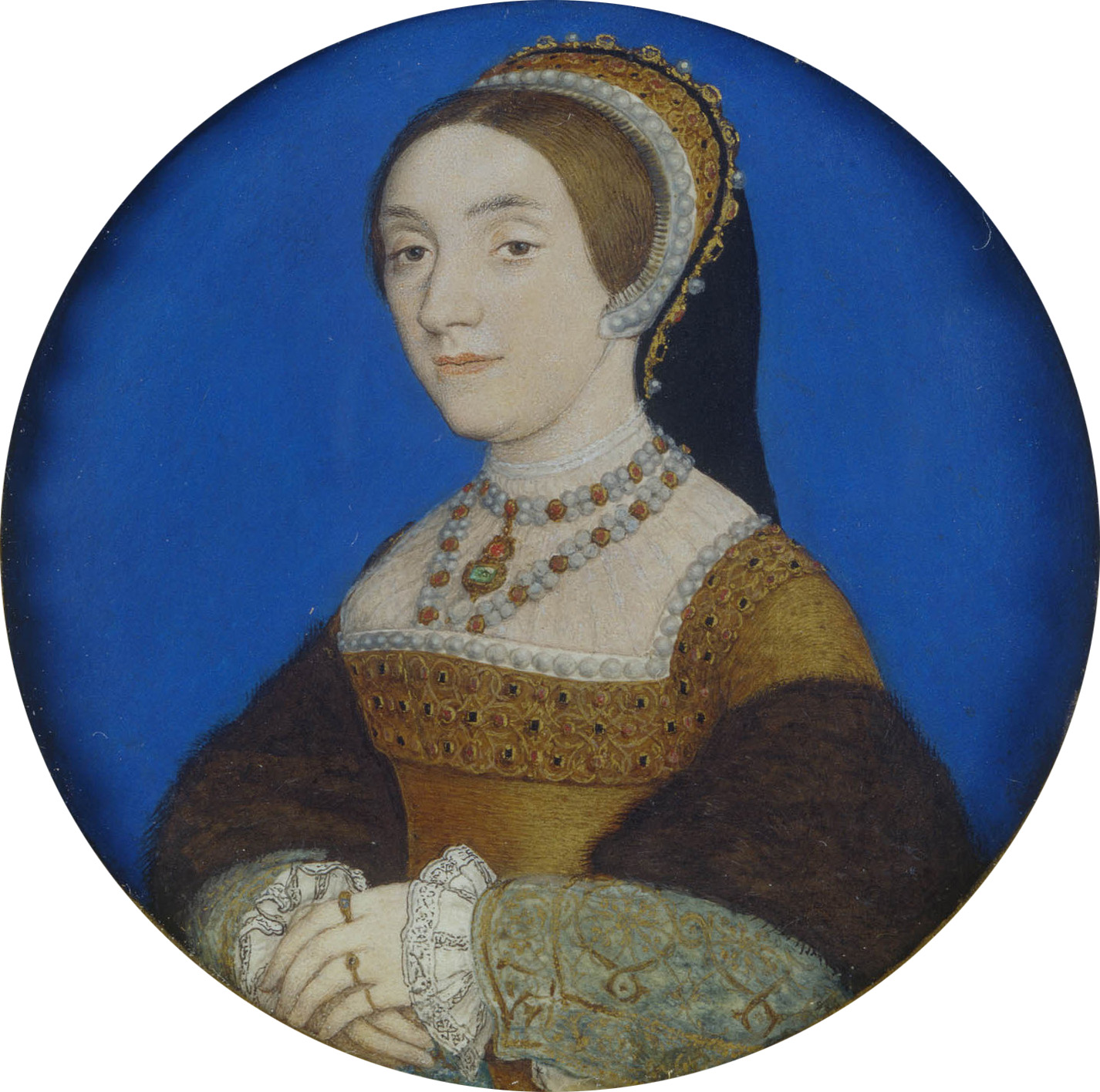
Holbein, Catherine Howard c. 1540; probably the only image of her from life - see text.

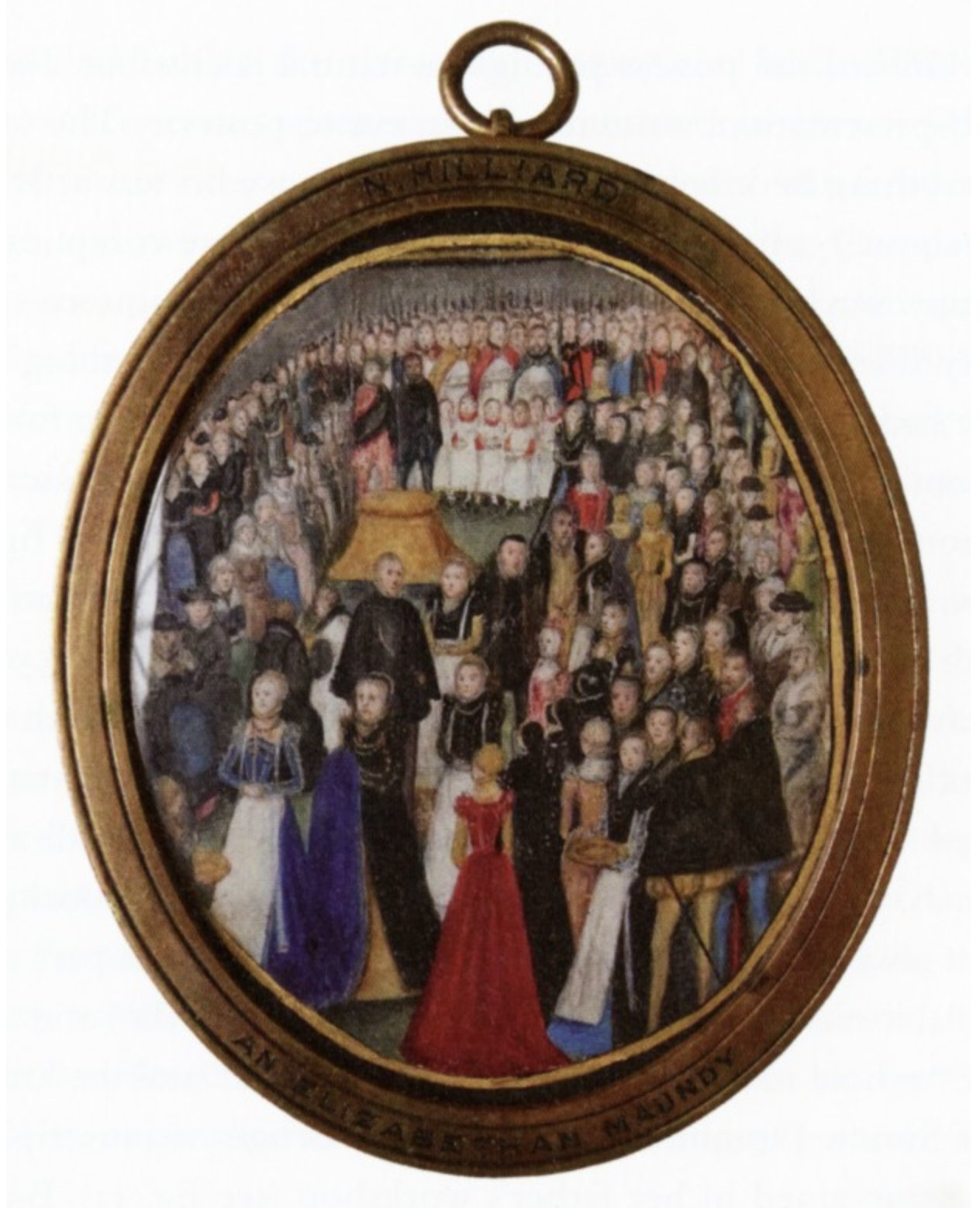
Attributed to Levina Teerlinc, An Elizabethan Maundy, c. 1560

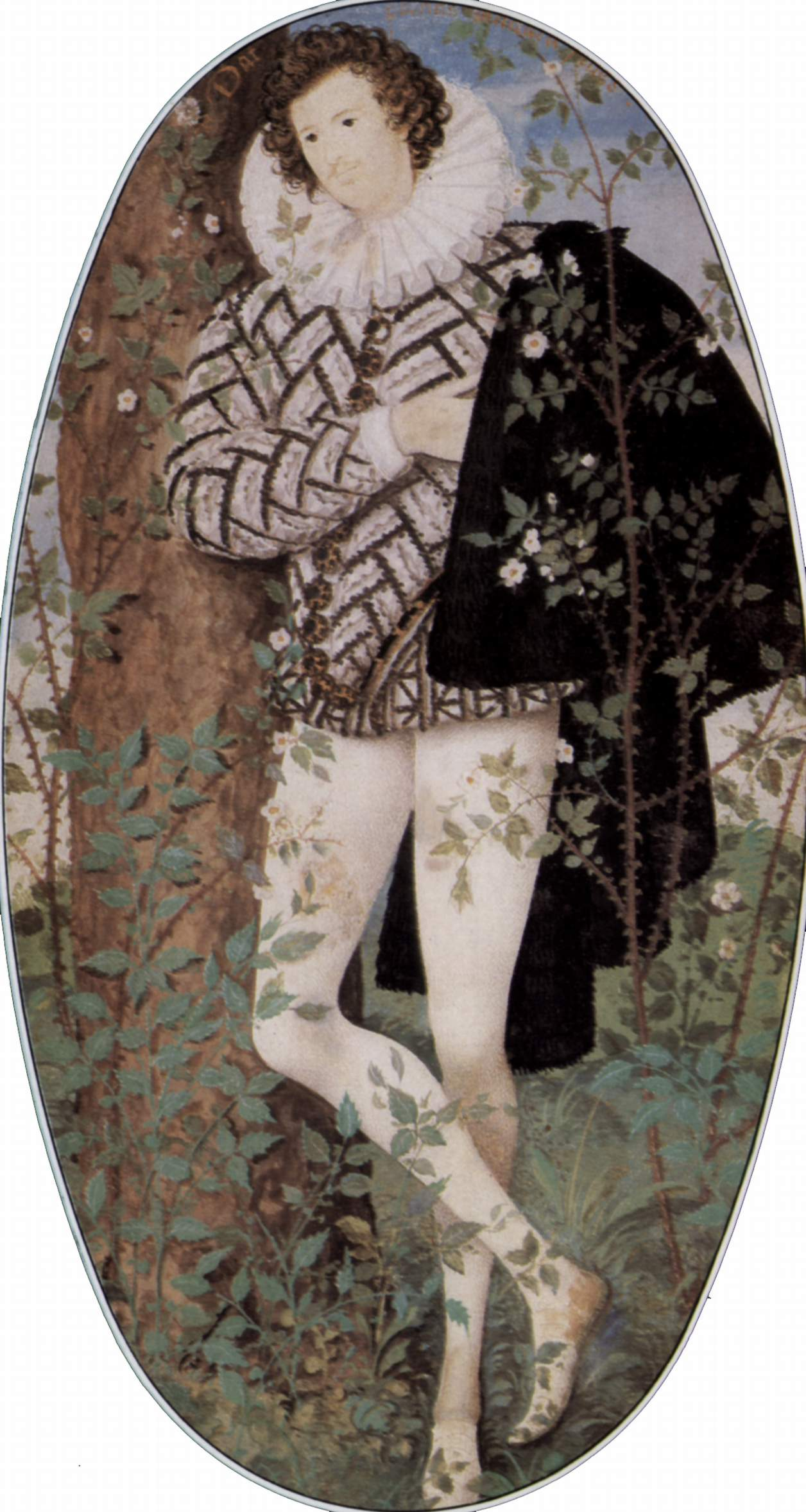
Nicholas Hilliard, Young Man Amongst Roses c. 1588

=== Preparatory drawings ===
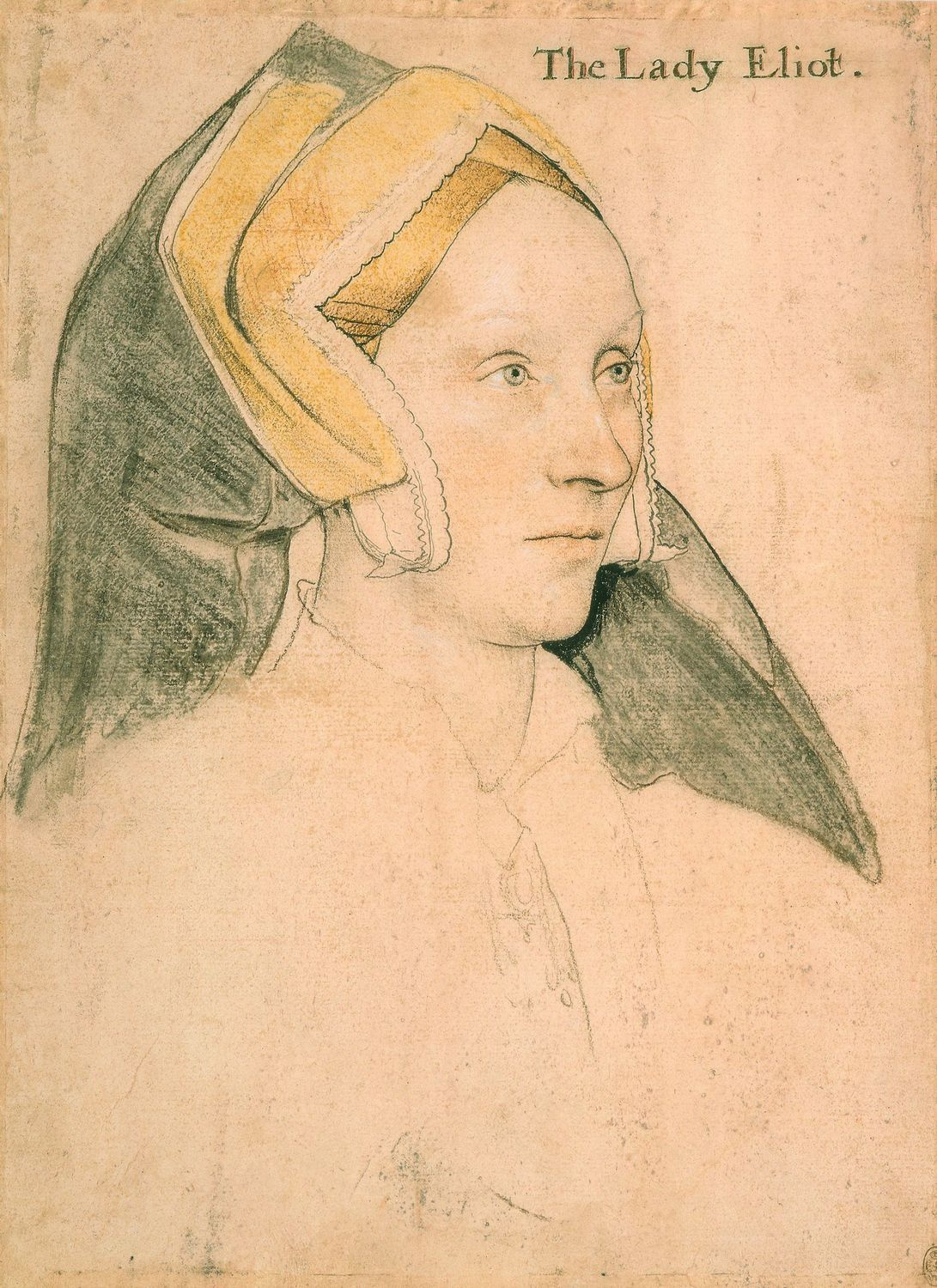
Sketch of Lady Elyot by Holbein in chalk, pen and brush on paper, 1532–33, Royal Collection, Windsor

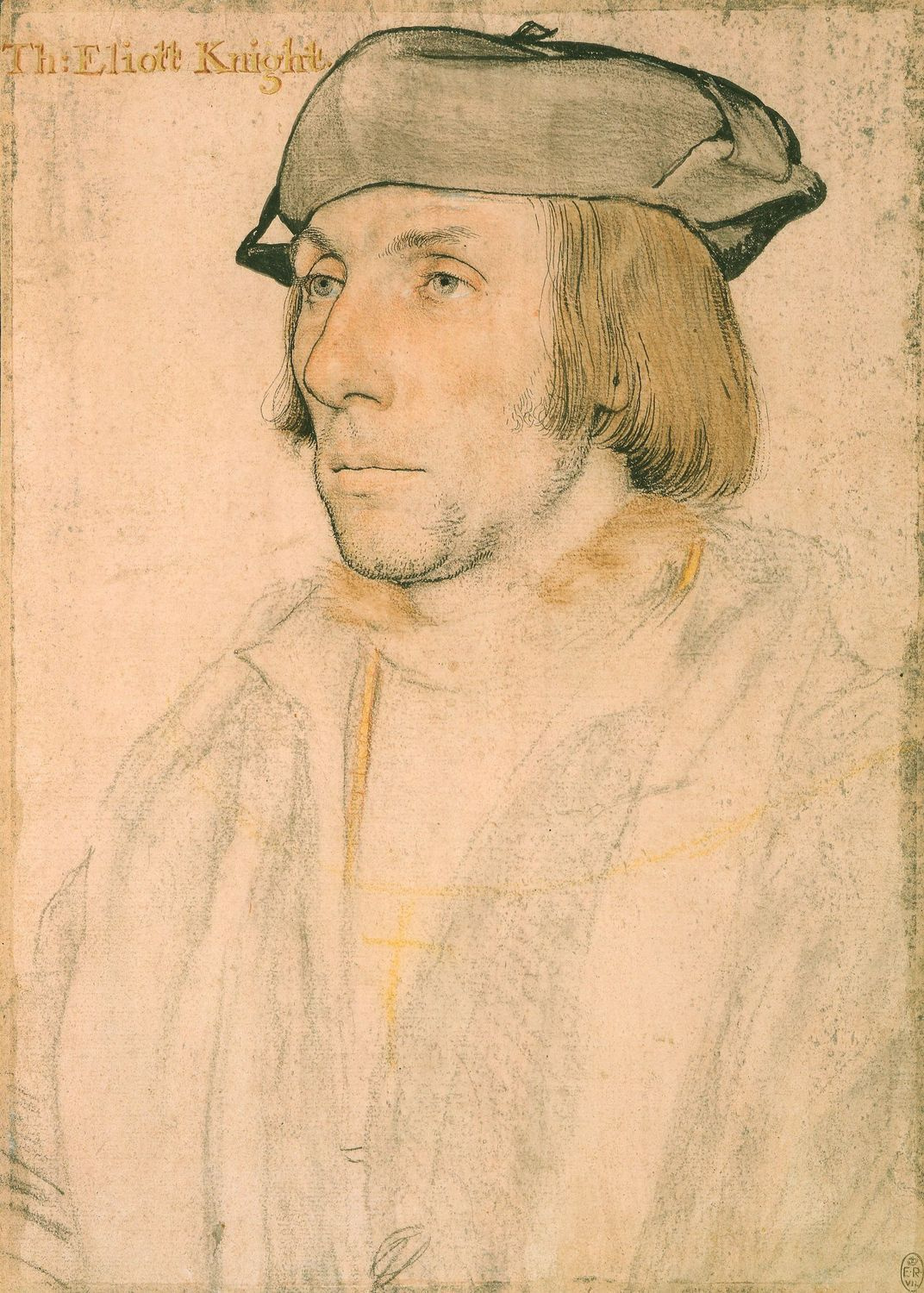
Companion sketch of Sir Thomas Elyot by Holbein, Royal Collection, Windsor. Neither portrait has survived.

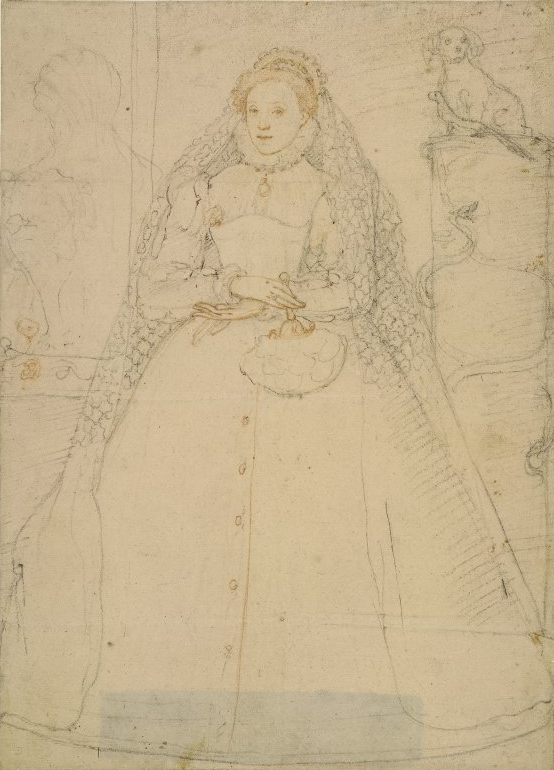
Preliminary chalk sketch for a portrait of Elizabeth I by Federico Zuccari, 1570s, which has not survived.

=== Panel paintings ===
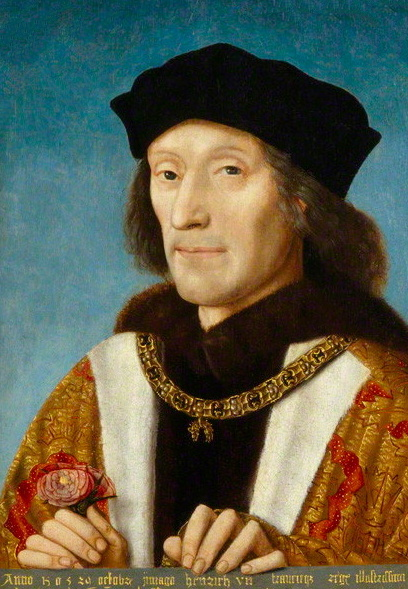
Henry VII no longer thought to be by Michael Sittow, c. 1505.

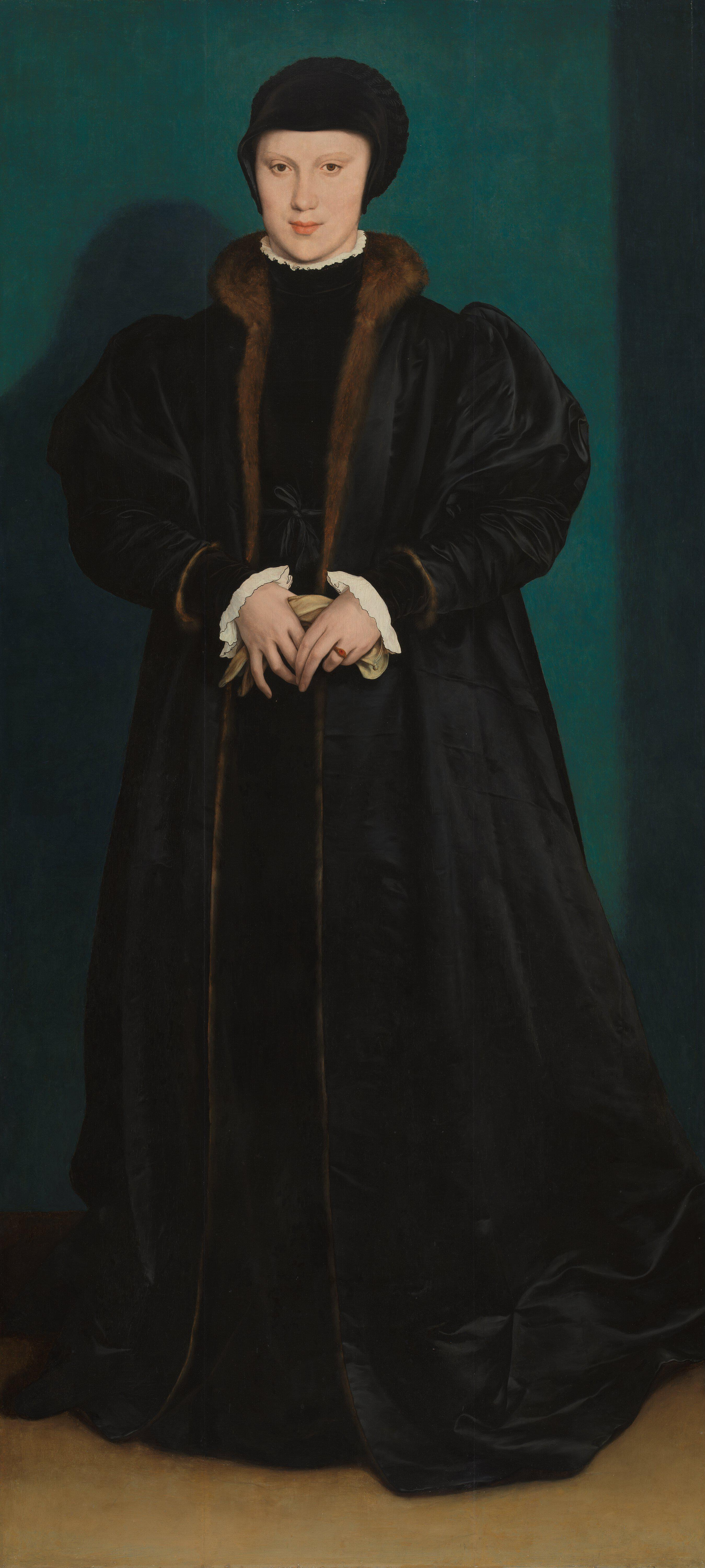
Christina of Denmark in mourning, 1538. A prospective bride for Henry VIII, who Holbein was sent to portray.

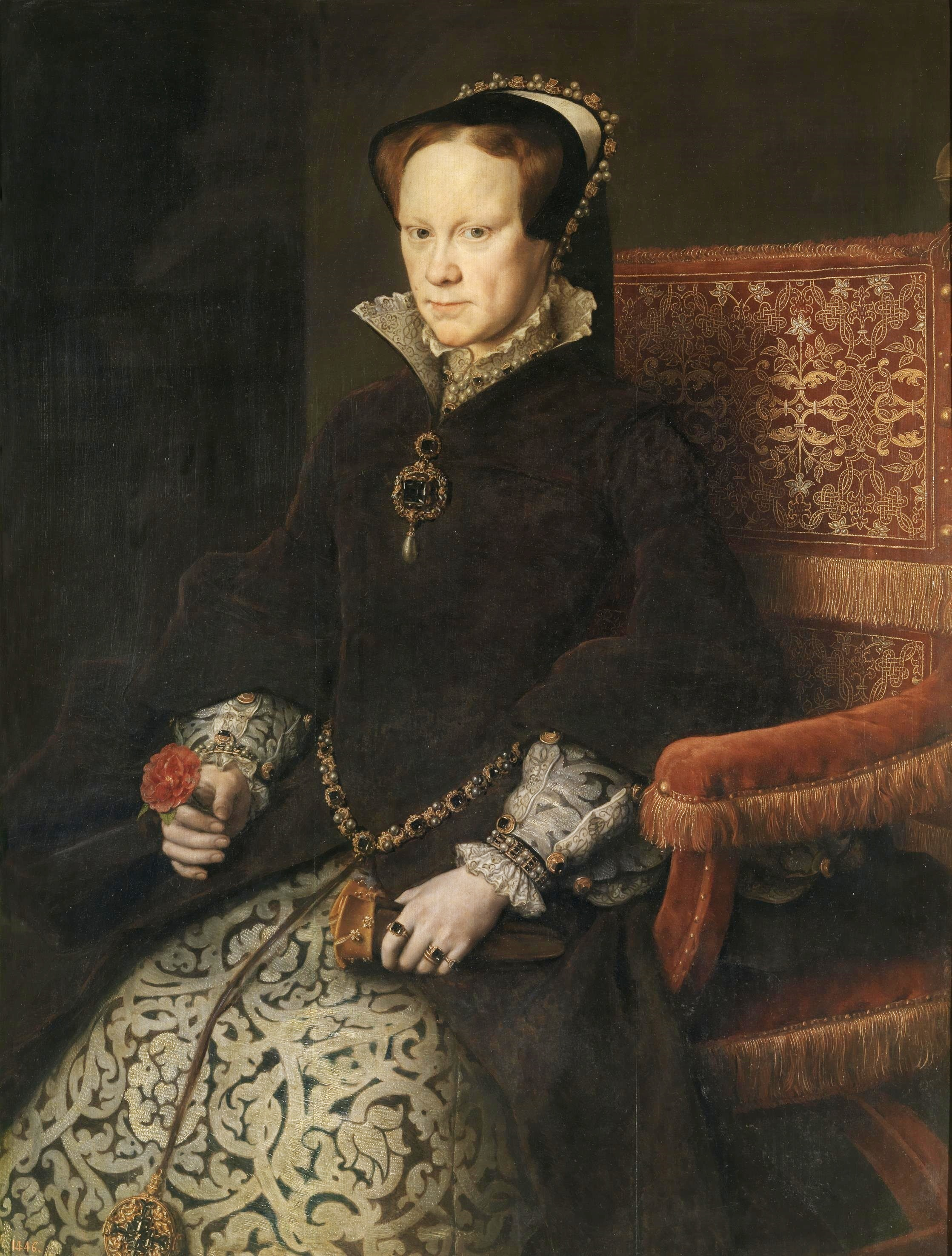
Mary I by Anthonis Mor, c. 1541

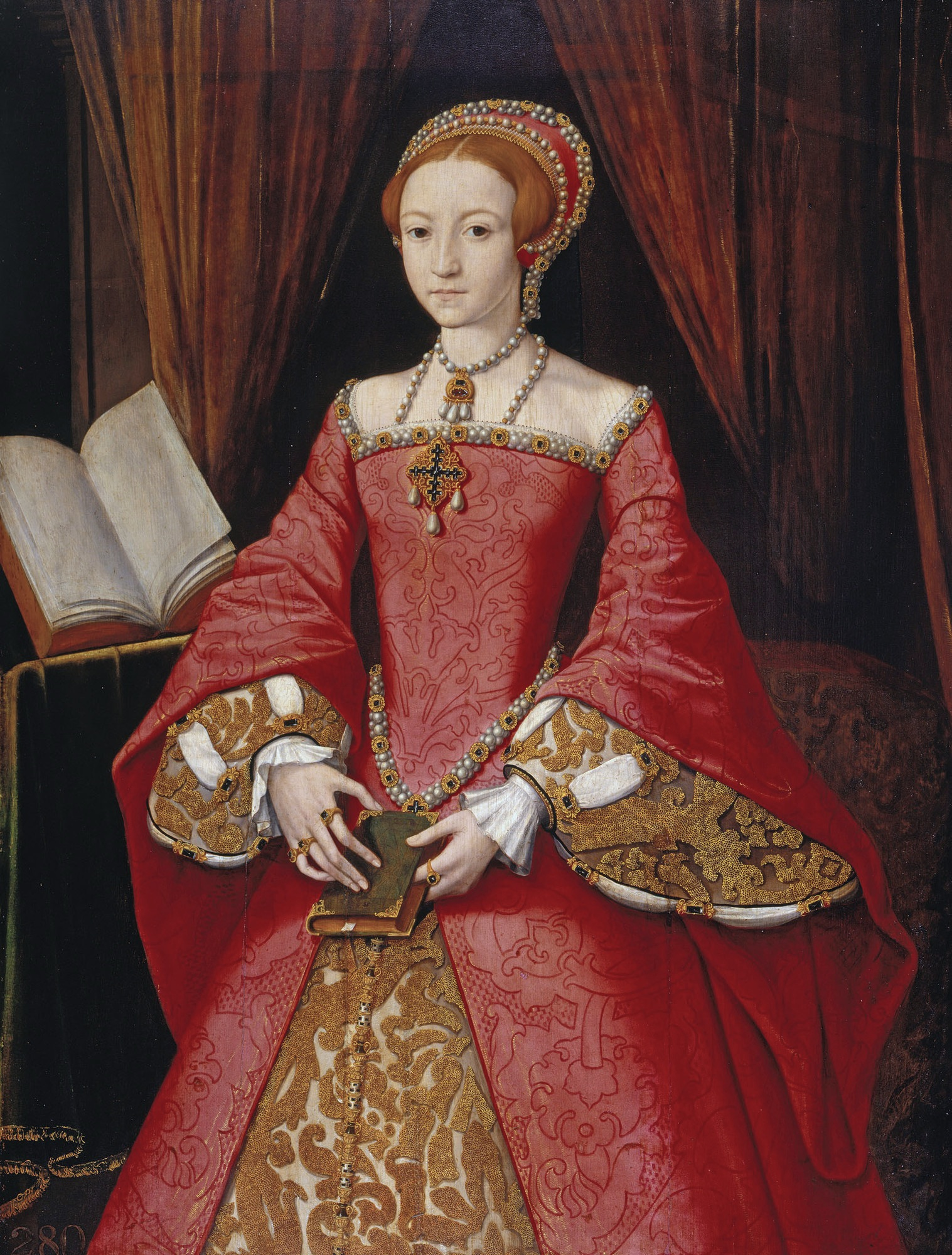
Elizabeth I as a Princess, formerly attributed to William Scrots, c. 1546

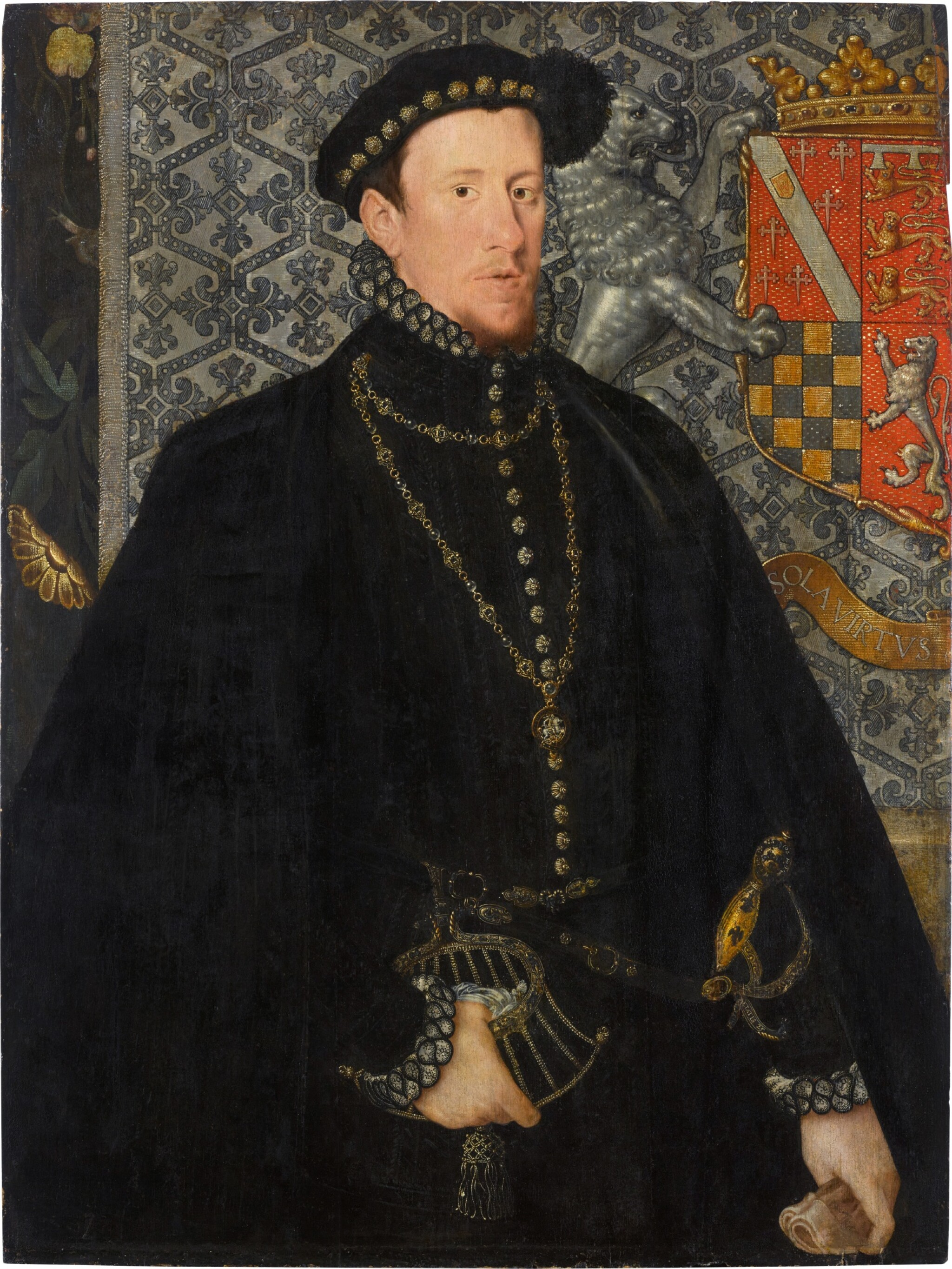
Thomas Howard, 4th Duke of Norfolk by Hans Eworth, 1563

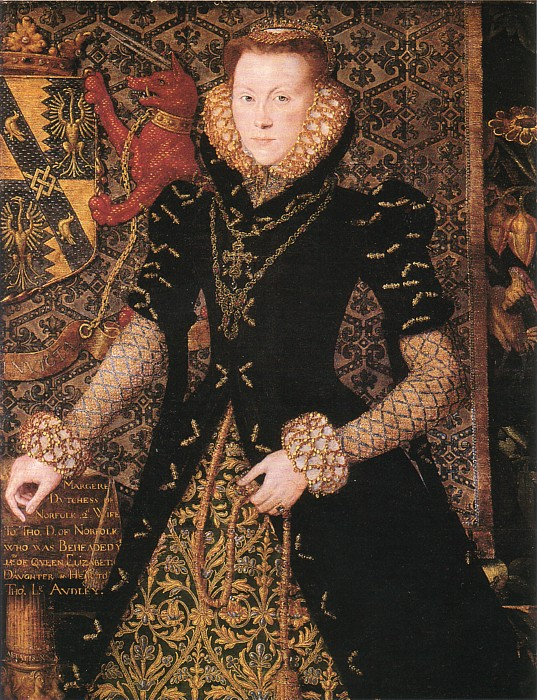
Margaret Audley, Duchess of Norfolk, 1562, companion to portrait of the Duke, by Hans Eworth

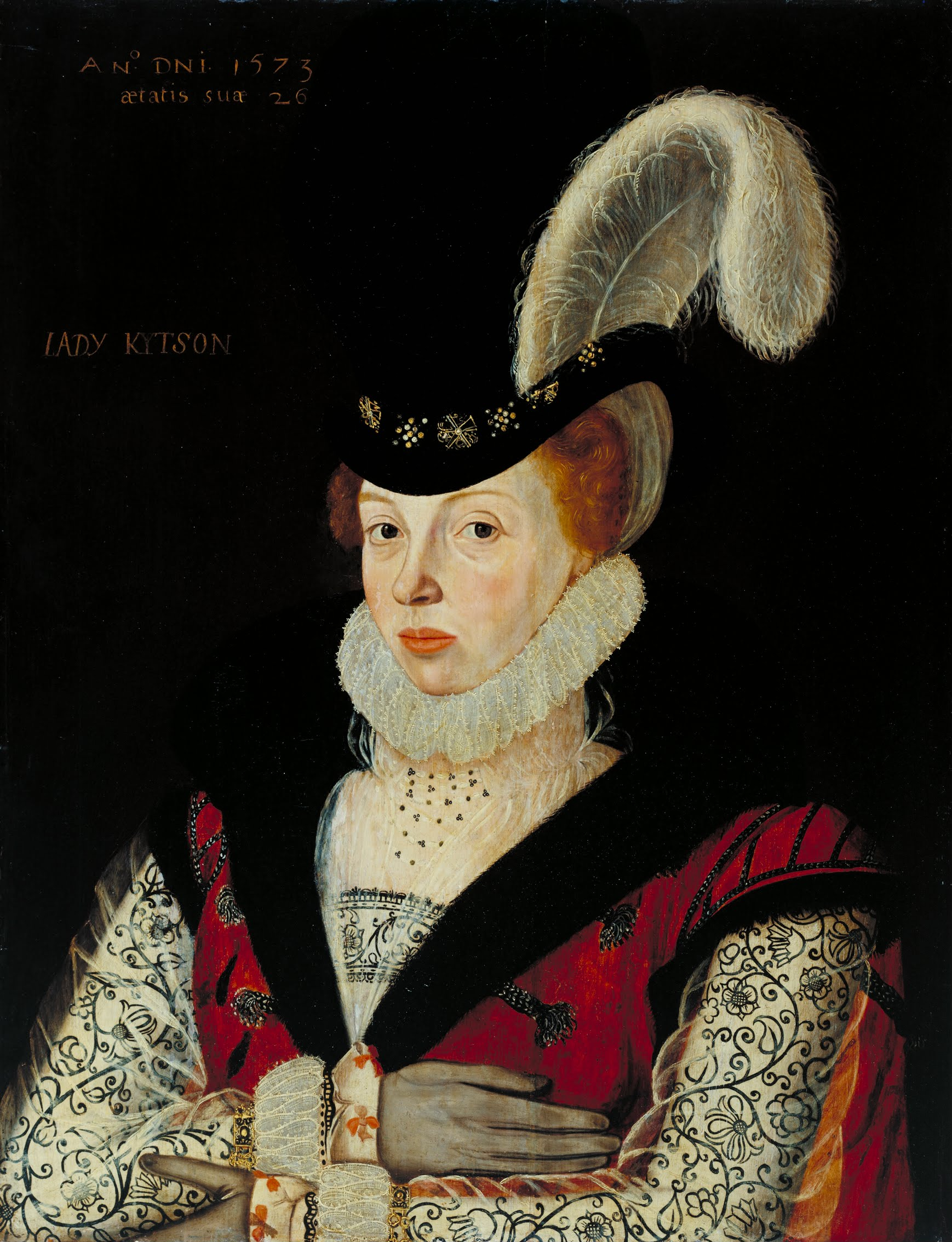
Portrait of Lady Kitson by George Gower, 1573

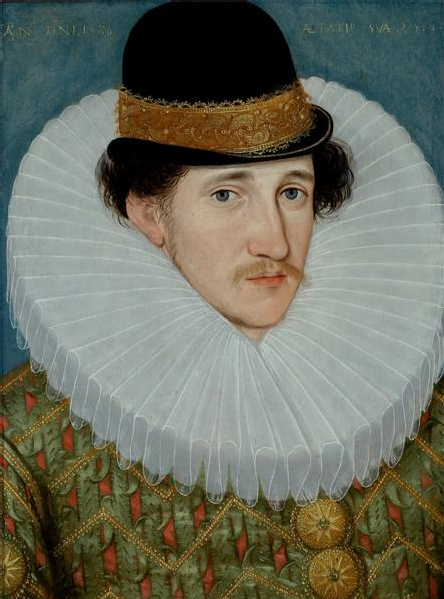
Edward Talbot, 8th Earl of Shrewsbury, 1586 by Hieronimo Custodis

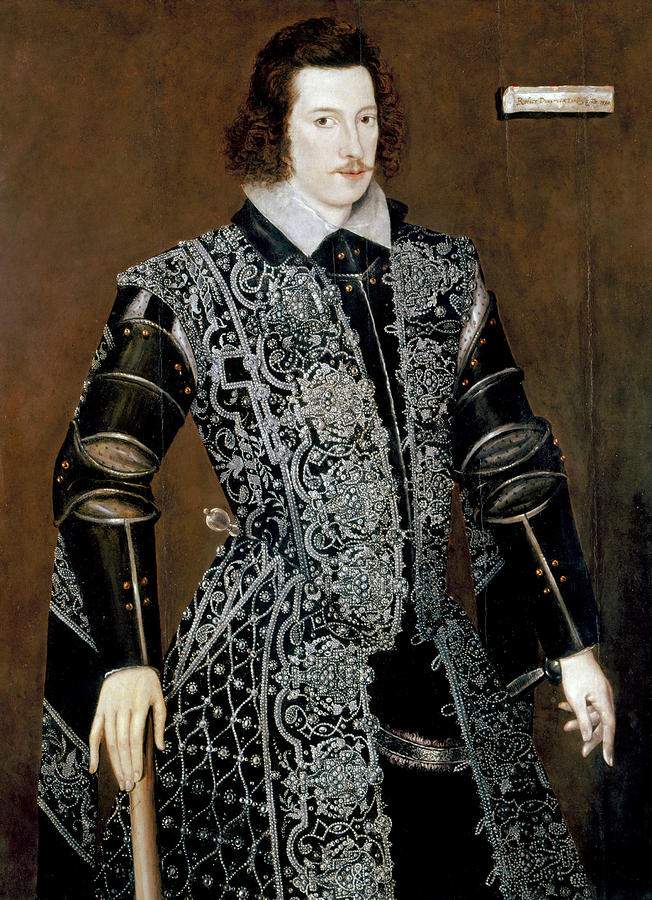
The Earl of Essex in tilting armor by William Segar, 1590

=== Paintings on canvas ===
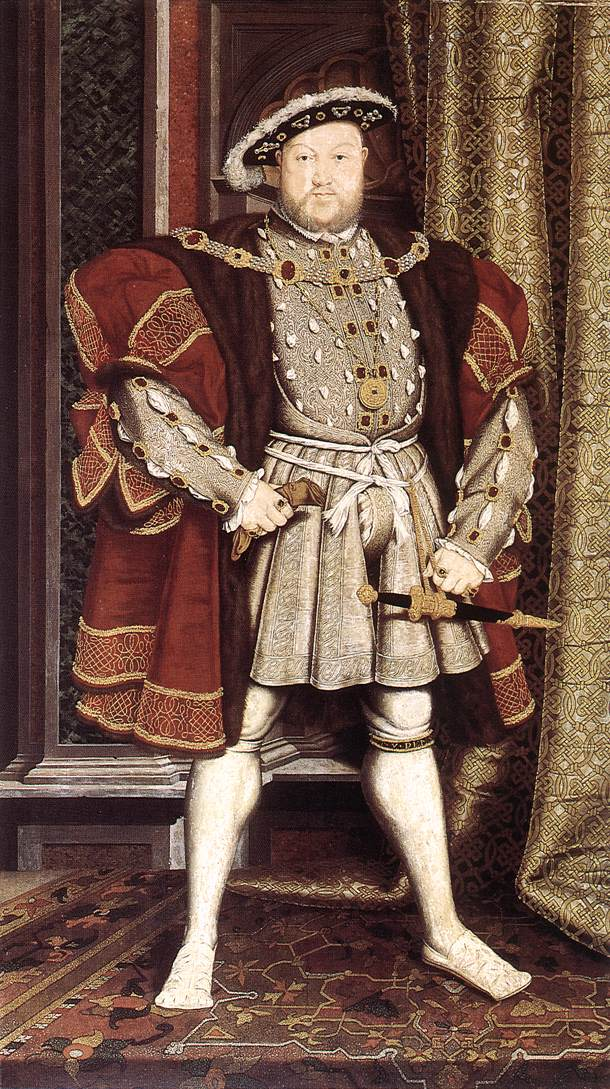
Henry VIII after a Holbein of 1537. Later copy by unknown artist after Hans Holbein the Younger's destroyed mural at Whitehall Palace. (Note: a full copy The original cartoon, slightly different in pose, also survives (National Portrait Gallery, London), but no original Holbein version of this iconic image does. See Holbein and the Court of Henry VIII, 122-5.)

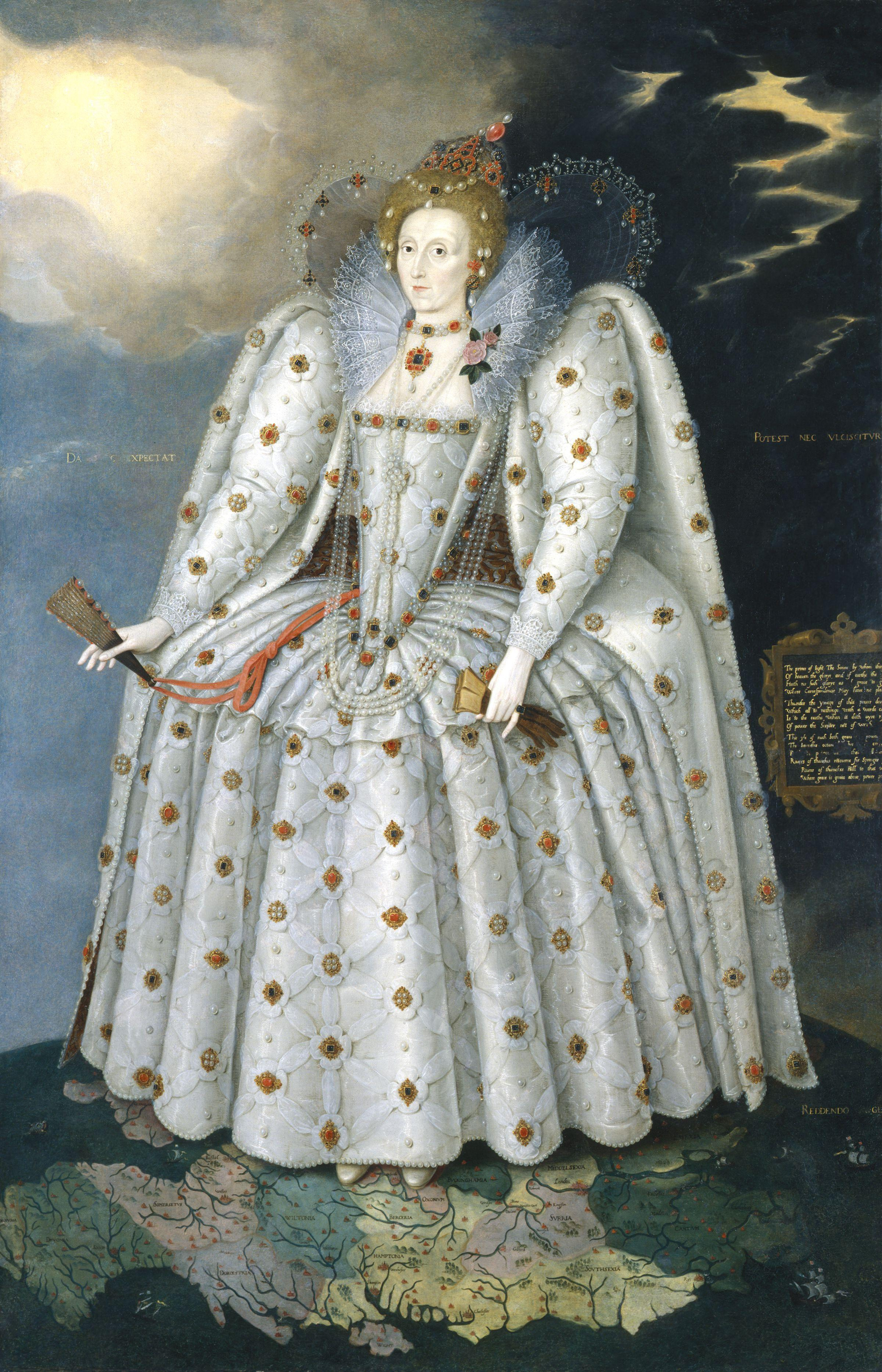
The Ditchley Portrait of Elizabeth by Marcus Gheeraerts the Younger, 1592

== See also ==
- Portrait of Henry VIII
- Portraiture of Elizabeth I
