= Serjeant Painter =

British royal paintmaster up to the 18th-century

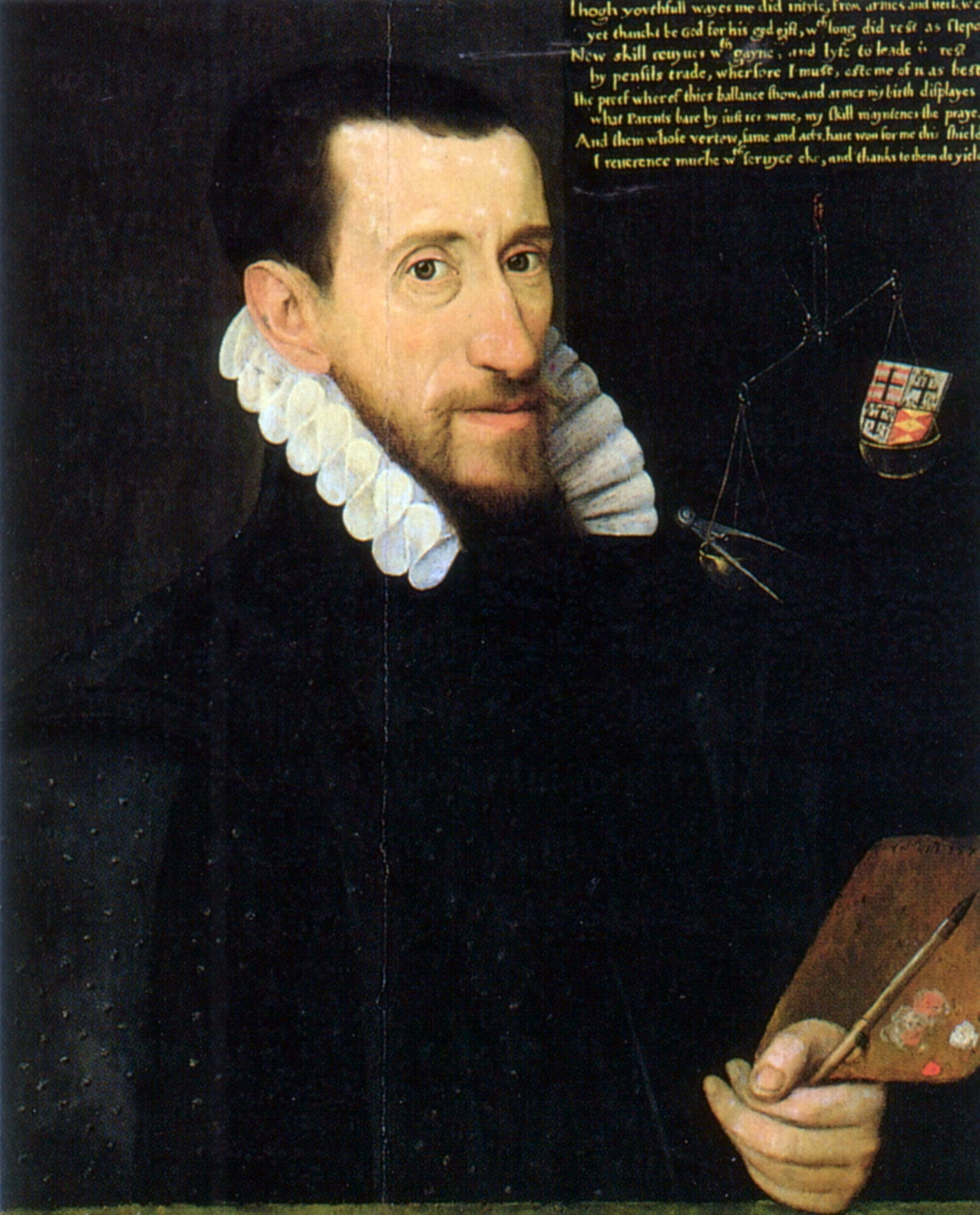
George Gower, self-portrait, 1579, private collection.

The Serjeant Painter was an honourable and lucrative position as court painter with the English monarch. It carried with it the prerogative of painting and gilding all of the King's residences, coaches, banners, etc. and it grossed over £1,000 in a good year by the 18th century. The work itself involved painting the palaces, coaches, royal barges, and all sorts of decorations for festivities, which often had to be designed as well. The actual involvement of the serjeant painters in this gradually declined. The post itself fell out of use in the 18th century, after a period when "fine art" painters were appointed, and expected to supervise rather than execute decorative painting, for a good salary.

== History ==
The post of serjeant-painter came into being with the appointment of John Browne in 1511–12. In the time of Henry VIII, they seem to have acted as at least foremen for the actual workers; from 1527, better artists were made "King's Painter", like Lucas Horenbout. They may have also painted portraits. George Gower was appointed by Elizabeth I in 1581, and in 1603, James I appointed John de Critz at £40 a year (a good salary) together with another - first Leonard Fryer, and from 1610 Robert Peake the Elder. Gower and de Critz were reputable artists, as was Peake, and these appointments mark a stage in the divorce of the position from the actual work involved. For Anthony van Dyck the position of Principal Painter in Ordinary was devised, at a retainer of £200 p.a.; this continued until Queen Victoria and was nearly always given to a portraitist. By the 18th century most of the work was done by assistants. In 1720 Sir James Thornhill was appointed Serjeant Painter and, in 1757, William Hogarth.

The last known holder was James Stewart, of whom no records are available after 1782, though it is not clear whether the post was ever actually abolished. In a patent issued on 7 May 1679 for Robert Streater Jr, a list of previous serjeant-painters is given, including "John Decreetz & Robert Peake" as joint-holders of the post. De Critz was given the post in 1603 but is first described as sharing the office with Leonard Fryer, who had held it since 1595. Robert Peake was appointed jointly with de Critz in 1607, or 1610. A payment made to de Critz in 1633 shows that he was paid a retainer of £40 a year.

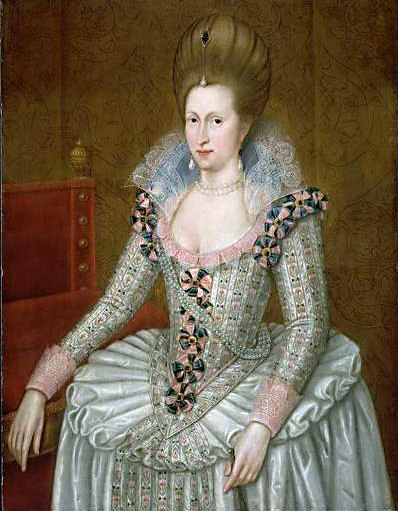
Anne of Denmark. John de Critz, c.1605.

== The role ==
The role of the serjeant painter was elastic in its definition of duties: it involved not just the painting of original portraits but of their reproductions in new versions, to be sent to other courts (King James, unlike Elizabeth, was markedly averse to sitting for his portrait) as well as copying and restoring portraits by other painters in the royal collection, and many decorative tasks, for example scene painting and the painting of banners.

The lines of demarcation between the work of the serjeant-painters and that of other artists employed by the court sometimes needed clarification. A patent drafted in 1584, but apparently never signed, gave the serjeant-painter George Gower the monopoly of "all manner of portraits and pictures" of the Queen, "excepting only one Nicholas Hilliard, to whom it shall or may be lawful to exercise and make portraits, pictures, or proportions of our body and person in small compass in limning only" (Hilliard's monopoly was signed). At the time, Nicholas Hilliard was the leading artist in limning, the painting of portrait miniatures. This was regarded as the highest form of painting, while easel painting "in large" was still associated with interior decorating. In 1606, Hilliard seems to have trodden on the toes of the serjeant-painter John de Critz when he put himself forward to paint the tomb of Elizabeth I, claiming that he had "skill to make more radiant colours like unto enamels than yet is to Painters known". Hilliard reports in a letter to Robert Cecil, 1st Earl of Salisbury, that the recently appointed de Critz had reminded him that any painting of the royal tomb was "within the Serjeant's patent".

Horace Walpole provided information about some of the tasks de Critz performed in his Anecdotes of Painting in England, which he based closely on the notes of George Vertue, who had met acquaintances of de Critz and his family. In particular, Walpole quoted from a scrap of paper, a "memorandum in his own hand", on which de Critz wrote bills for jobs completed. On one side was his bill for work on a sun-dial:

For several times oyling and laying with fayre white a stone for a sun-dyall opposite to some part of the king and queen’s lodgings, the lines thereof being drawn in severall colours, the letters directing to the bowers guilded with fine gould, as alsoe the glory, and a scrowle guilded with fine gould, whereon the number and figures specifying the planetary howers are inscribed; likewise certain letters drawne in black informing in what part of the compasse the sun at any time there shining shall be resident; the whole worke being circumferenced with a frett painted in a manner of a stone one, the compleat measure of the whole being six foote.

On the other side is a demand for payment for work on the royal barge:

John De Critz demaundeth allowance for these parcells of Worke following, viz. For repayreing, refreshing, washing and varnishing the whole body of his Majesty’s privy barge, and mending with fine gould and faire colours many and divers parts thereof, as about the chaire of state, the doores, and most of the antiques about the windowes, that had bene galled and defaced, the two figures at the entrance being most new coloured and painted, the Mercury and the lion that are fixed to the sternes of this and the row barge being in several places repayred both with gould and colours, as also the taffarils on the top of the barge in many parts guilded and strowed with fayre byse. The two figures of Justice and Fortitude most an end [sic] being quite new painted and guilded. The border on the outside of the bulk being new layd with faire white and trayled over with greene according to the custom heretofore—and for baying and colouring the whole number of the oares for the row barge being thirty-six.

Walpole also noted that de Critz painted a gilded "middle piece" for a ceiling at Oaklands Palace and repaired pictures, and he quoted a wardrobe account for work on the royal carriages: "To John De Critz, serjeant-painter, for painting and gilding with good gold the body and carriages of two coaches and the carriage of one chariot and other necessaries, 179l.3s.4d. anno 1634."

Walpole said of de Critz that "His life is to be collected rather from office-books than from his works or his reputation"; and the comparative mundanity of some of the tasks he undertook has led to a downplaying of the artistic role of the serjeant-painter. Art historian William Gaunt describes de Critz's role as "mainly that of a handyman". A Burlington Magazine editorial remarked:

A great deal of easy fun has been poked at the institution of the serjeant-painters, because these had to attend to tasks such as downright house-painting, the painting of barges and coaches, the provision of banners and streamers, and so on.

William Hogarth, who was appointed serjeant-painter in 1757, even poked fun at the post himself, after receiving the grandiose official patent, which referred to him as "Our Trusty and wellbeloved William Hogarth Gentleman". Among other duties, including the "Office of the Revels", the patent covered "Our Navys and Shops Barges and Close Barges Coaches Chariots Charoches Litters Wagons and Close Carrs Tents & Pavilions Heralds Coats Trumpets Banners". Hogarth made up his own mock version:

...know ye that I for divers good causes and considerations as hereunto especial moving of our especial grace and our certain knowledge and meer motion have given and granted and by these presents to [sic] give and grant to my trusty and wellbeloved WH gentleman the office of scene painter and corporal Painter to all my whatsoever...

Hogarth succeeded his brother-in-law John Thornhill, who had fallen ill and resigned the post. Hogarth's father-in-law, Sir James Thornhill, had also been serjeant-painter (he himself had succeeded Thomas Highmore through family connections). Though Hogarth's salary for the post was only £10, it was potentially lucrative: Hogarth wrote that he was now "landed as it were and secured from tugging any longer at the ore". Hogarth found himself responsible for all royal commissions for painting and gilding—anything from palace decorations to flags and boxes. After paying workmen and a deputy, he reckoned five years later that he was making £200 a year profit as serjeant-painter. However, the office, which came under the Board of Works, was not as prestigious as Hogarth would have liked. Joshua Reynolds was employed to paint leading members of the court and able to charge much higher prices than Hogarth, as a result of direct court patronage.

== List of serjeant painters ==
- John Browne, heraldic painter since 1502, appointed "King's Painter" in 1511/12, worked at the Field of the Cloth of Gold in 1520, and was the first Serjeant Painter in 1527, when the imported artist Lucas Horenbout took over as "King's Painter" – now the superior position. Browne died in office in December 1532.
- Andrew Wright
- "Antony Toto", really Antonio di Nunziato d'Antonio, a pupil of Ridolfo Ghirlandaio from 1544, who died in office in 1554. He was the first Serjeant Painter who can be evidenced as an artist rather than an artisan. None of his paintings are known to survive, but his New Year gifts to Henry, presumably his own work, are documented as including a Calumny of Apelles (1538/39) and a Story of King Alexander (1540/41). He had an Italian colleague Bartolommeo Penni, brother of the much more distinguished Luca and Gianfrancesco, Raphael's right hand man. Both probably came to Henry from Cardinal Wolsey, as they first appear in the accounts just after Wolsey's fall in October 1529. "Toto" had been signed on in Florence in 1519 as an assistant to Pietro Torrigiano, who in fact left England for good later that year.
- Nicholas Lyzarde (or Lizard / Lisory) held the post from 1554 to 1571. Lyzarde had worked for the Office of the Revels since 1544.
- William Herne or Heron, 1572 to 1580
- George Gower 1581 until his death in 1596
- Leonard Fryer 1596-1605, joined by
- John de Critz the Elder from 1603 until he died in 1642, later joined by
- Robert Peake the Elder, on Fryer's death in 1607, he had been painter to Henry Frederick, Prince of Wales since 1610. Peake tended to paint royal portraits while de Critz supervised a large department that painted and decorated royal residences and palaces. Peake died in 1619.
- John de Critz the Younger succeeded his father on his death in March 1642, having probably been doing most of the work for some years, as his father was over ninety when he died. John the Younger died in the fighting at Oxford soon after, by which stage Charles I was very short of palaces or barges to paint.
- William Dobson became the painter of the royal family and court during the difficult period of 1642–46, during the English Civil War. It is not recorded that he was officially appointed serjeant-painter, though Horace Walpole believed that he was. (Note: "On the death of Vandyck, Dobson was appointed serjeant-painter, and groom of the privy-chamber".) (Note: Art historian William Gaunt points out, however, that "it was scarcely a time for such ceremonial appointments".) According to art historian Ellis Waterhouse, the only evidence for Dobson's appointment as serjeant-painter derives from a note by the eighteenth-century antiquarian William Oldys.
- Sir Robert Howard was appointed in 1660 at the English Restoration. He was also a prominent politician and a well-known playwright. He is believed to have designed the scenery and machines for the Bridges Street Theatre, which opened in May 1663. Howard resigned the position of Serjeant Painter in that same year.
- Robert Streater or Streeter was appointed in 1663. He was essentially a topographical or landscape painter. Samuel Pepys noted him as "a very civil little man and lame but lives very handsomely". He painted the ceiling of the Sheldonian Theatre, Oxford. He died in 1679.
- Robert Streeter (the younger), son of the above.
- Thomas Highmore, to 1720. Appointed serjeant-painter to William III. Uncle of the painter Joseph Highmore.
- Sir James Thornhill, pupil of Thomas Highmore, from 1720; he was knighted the same year, and two years later became a Member of Parliament. He died in 1734.
- John Thornhill, son of Sir James, until shortly before his death in 1757.
- William Hogarth, brother-in-law of John Thornhill and son-in-law to Sir James, from 1757 until his death in 1764.
- Benjamin Wilson, succeeded William Hogarth upon his death in 1764.
- James Stewart to 1782 or perhaps later, the last appointment.

== See also ==
- Artists of the Tudor Court

== Bibliography ==
- Edmond, Mary (1983). Hilliard and Oliver: The Lives and Works of Two Great Miniaturists. London: Robert Hale. ISBN 0-7090-0927-5.
- Gaunt, William (1980). Court Painting in England from Tudor to Victorian Times. London: Constable. ISBN 0-09-461870-4.
- Paulson, Ronald Ian (1971). Hogarth: His Life, Art, and Times. New Haven, London: Yale University Press. ISBN 0-300-01766-9.
- Uglow, Jenny (1997). Hogarth: A Life and a World (1998 ed.). London: Faber and Faber. ISBN 0-571-19376-5.
- Walpole, Horace (1849). Anecdotes of Painting in England: With Some Account of the Principal Artists, and Notes on other Arts, Collected by the Late George Vertue. Digested and Published from his Original MSS, Vol II (1849 ed.). London: Henry. G. Bohn.
- Waterhouse, Ellis (1978). Painting in Britain, 1530-1790 (4th ed.). Penguin Books (now Yale History of Art series). ISBN 0-14-056101-3.
