= George Gower =

English painter

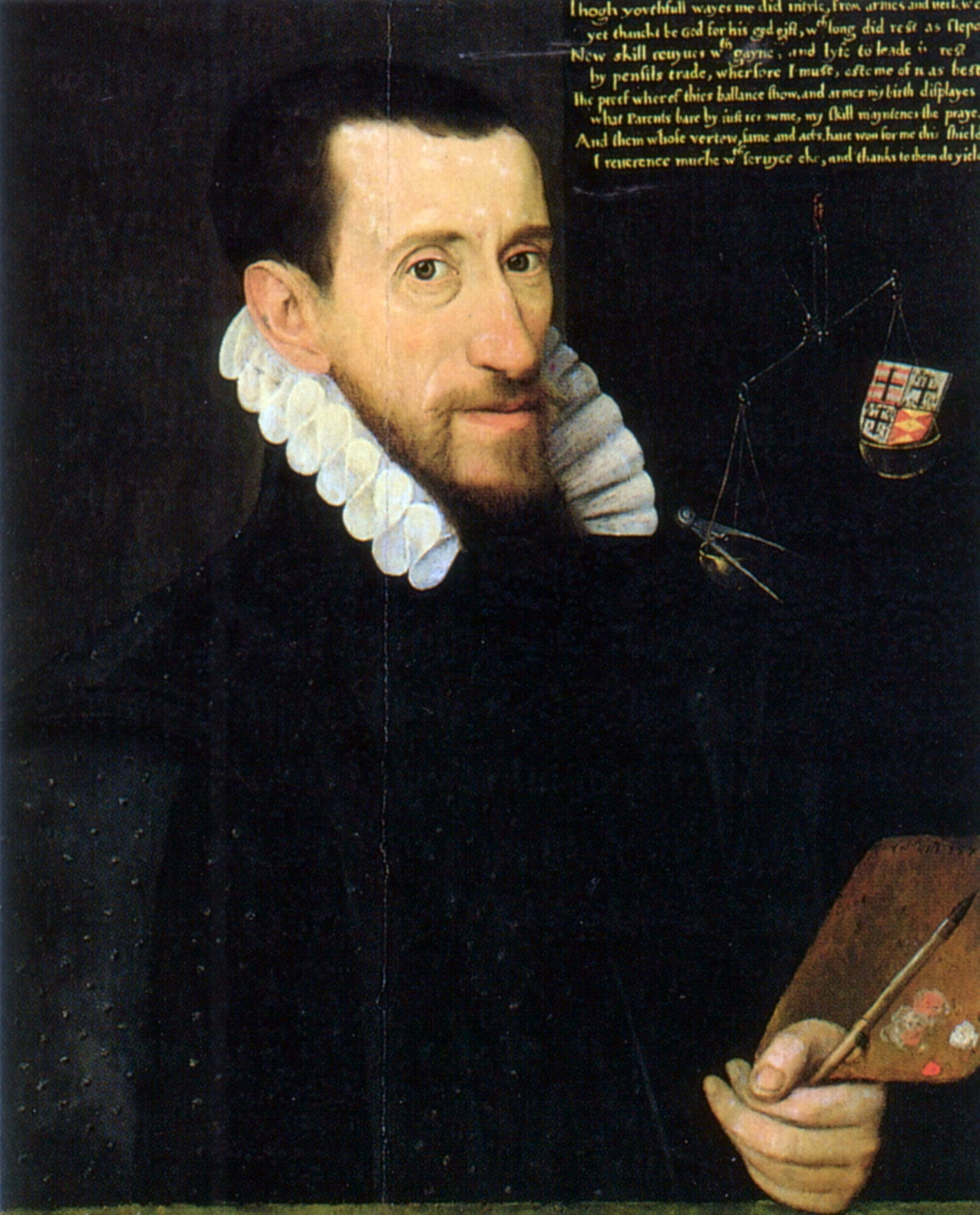
George Gower, self-portrait, 1579, private collection.

George Gower (c. 1540–1596) was an English portrait painter who became Serjeant Painter to Queen Elizabeth I in 1581.

== Biography ==
Very little is known about his early life except that he was a grandson of Sir John Gower of Stittenham, North Yorkshire.

His earliest documented works are the two 1573 companion portraits of Sir Thomas Kytson and his wife Lady Kytson, now in the Tate Gallery in London.

Gower painted a self-portrait in 1579 (right) that shows his coat of arms and his artist's tools of his trade. An allegorical device shows a balance with an artist's dividers outweighing the family coat of arms, "a startling claim in England where a painter was still viewed as little more than an artisan."

Gower is also famous for painting the Plimpton "Sieve" Portrait of Queen Elizabeth in 1579, now at the Folger Shakespeare Library. The sieve that Elizabeth carries signifies the Roman vestal virgin Tuccia, who carried water in a sieve to prove her chastity, thus representing Elizabeth's status as a virgin queen. The globe over her right shoulder symbolizes her position as the leader of global empire.

Gower was appointed to the position of Serjeant Painter to Queen Elizabeth in 1581. This allowed him to paint most of England’s aristocracy. The post also made him responsible for painted decoration at the royal residences, and on coaches and furniture. Among his works were a fountain (now destroyed) and the astronomical clock, both at Hampton Court Palace. He also inspected portraits of the Queen by other artists prior to their official release.

The version of the Armada Portrait of Elizabeth now at Woburn Abbey, painted to commemorate the 1588 defeat of the Spanish Armada, was formerly attributed to Gower, as was a cut down version in the National Portrait Gallery (United Kingdom). All three extant versions are now thought to be the work of different unknown English artists.

Gower died in London.

== Gallery ==
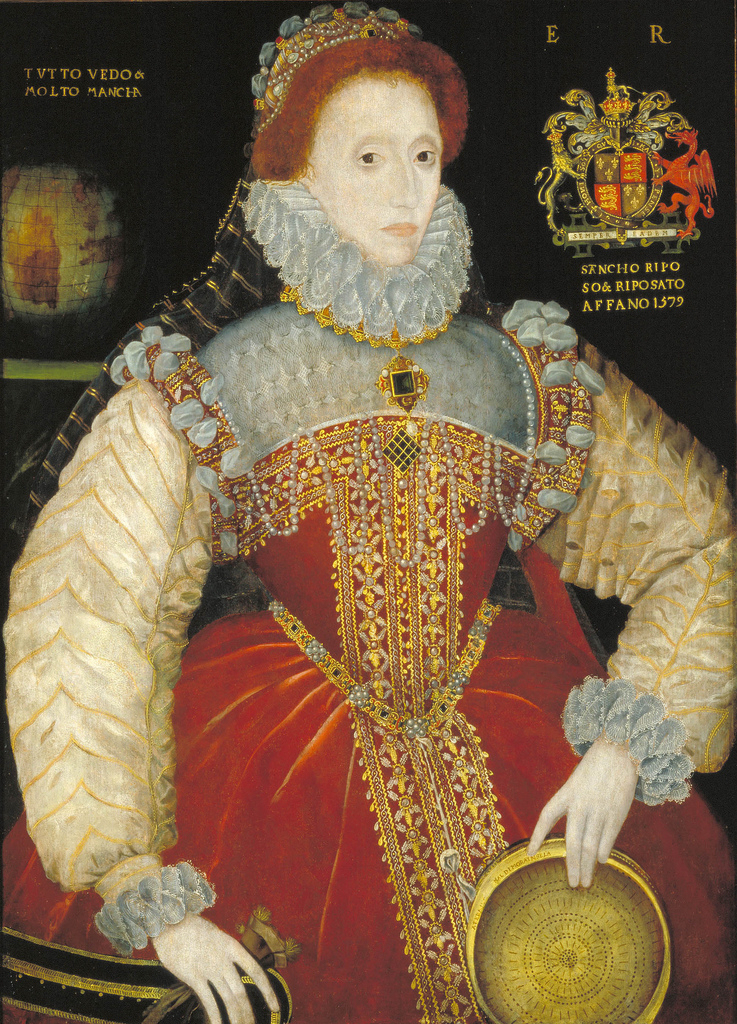
Elizabeth I, the Plimpton Sieve Portrait

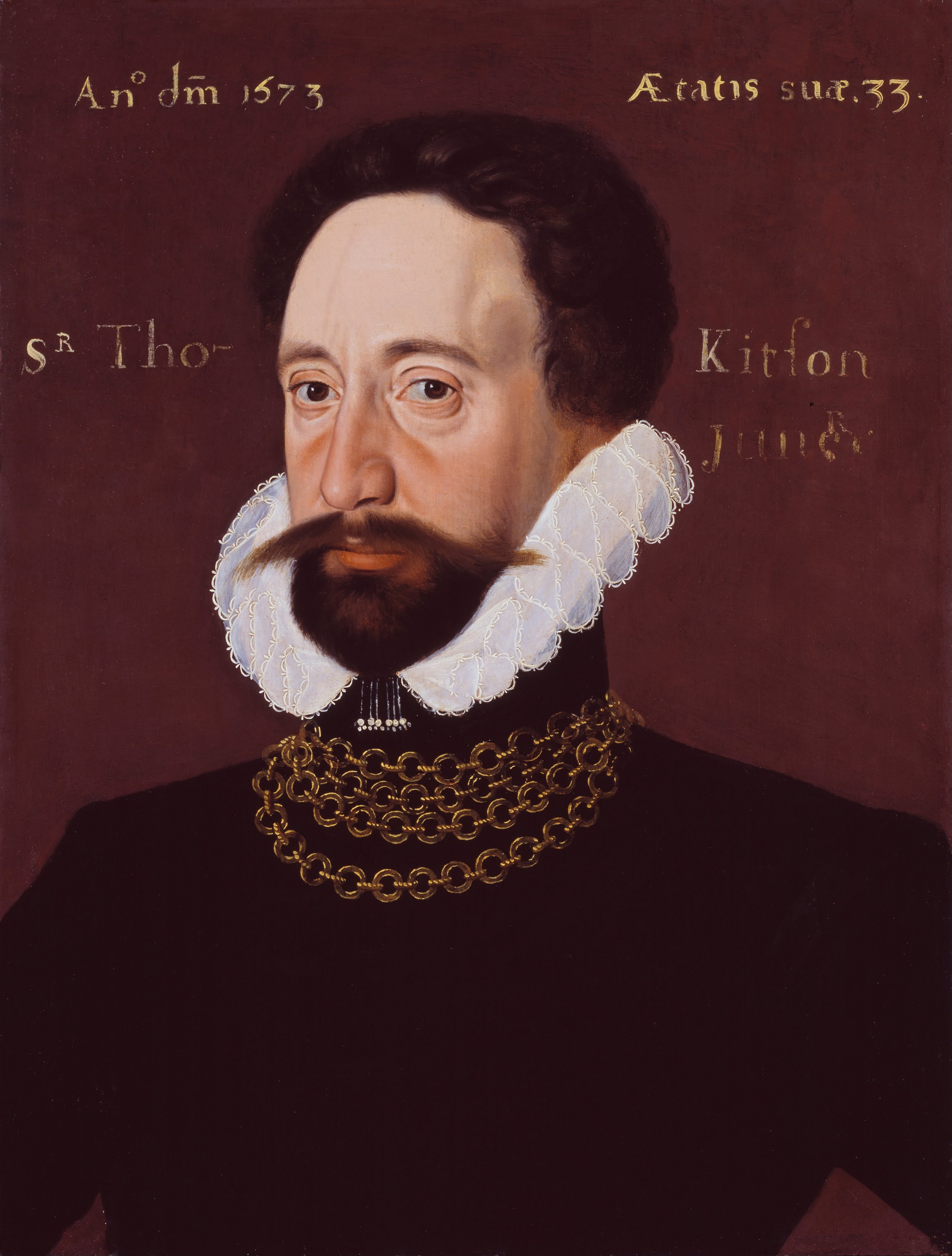
Thomas Kytson

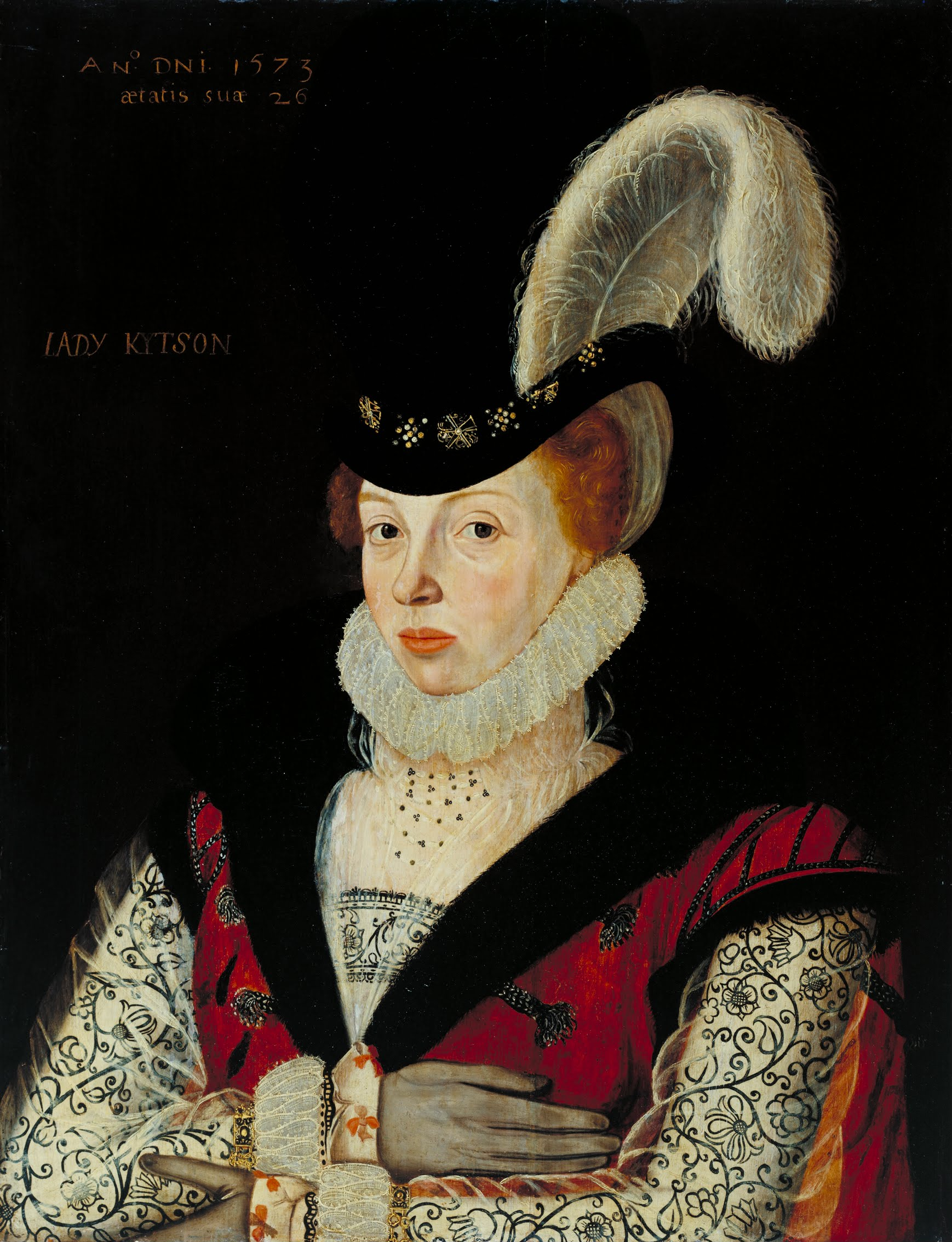
Elizabeth Kytson née Cornwallis

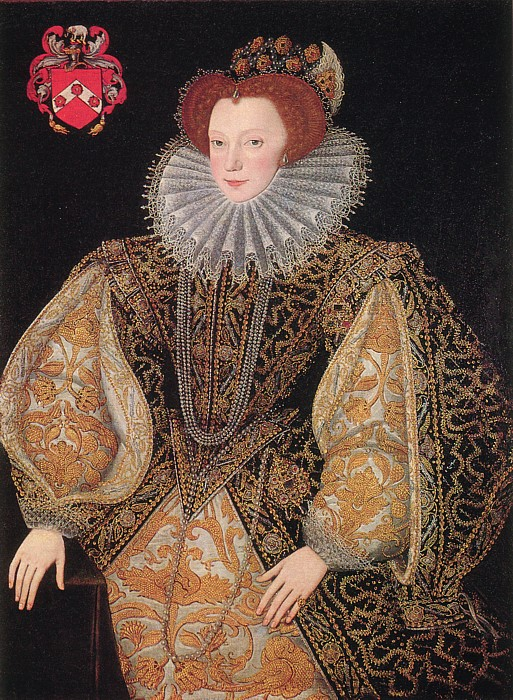
Lettice Knollys

Elizabeth Knollys

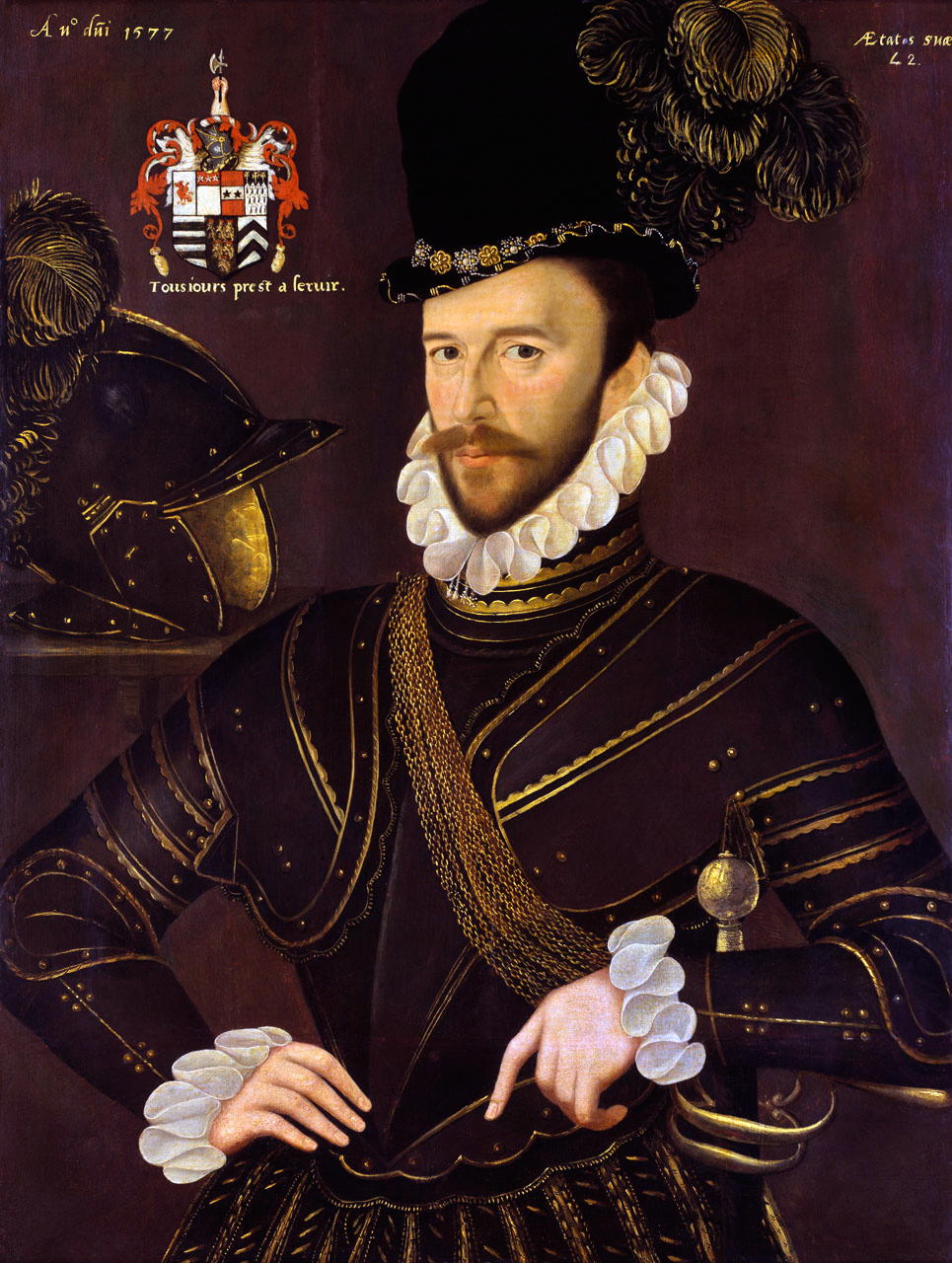
Richard Drake

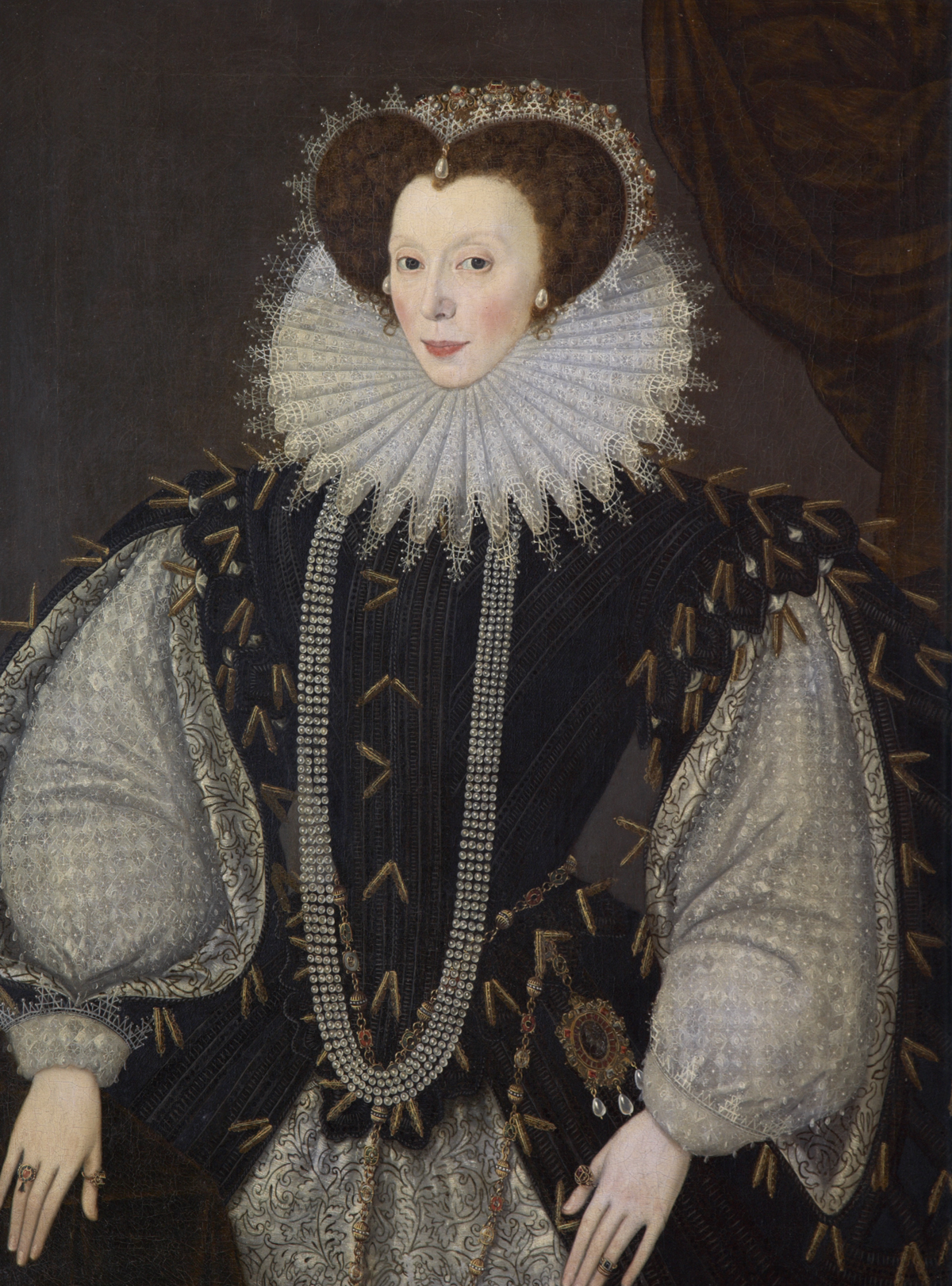
Elizabeth Sydenham Lady Drake

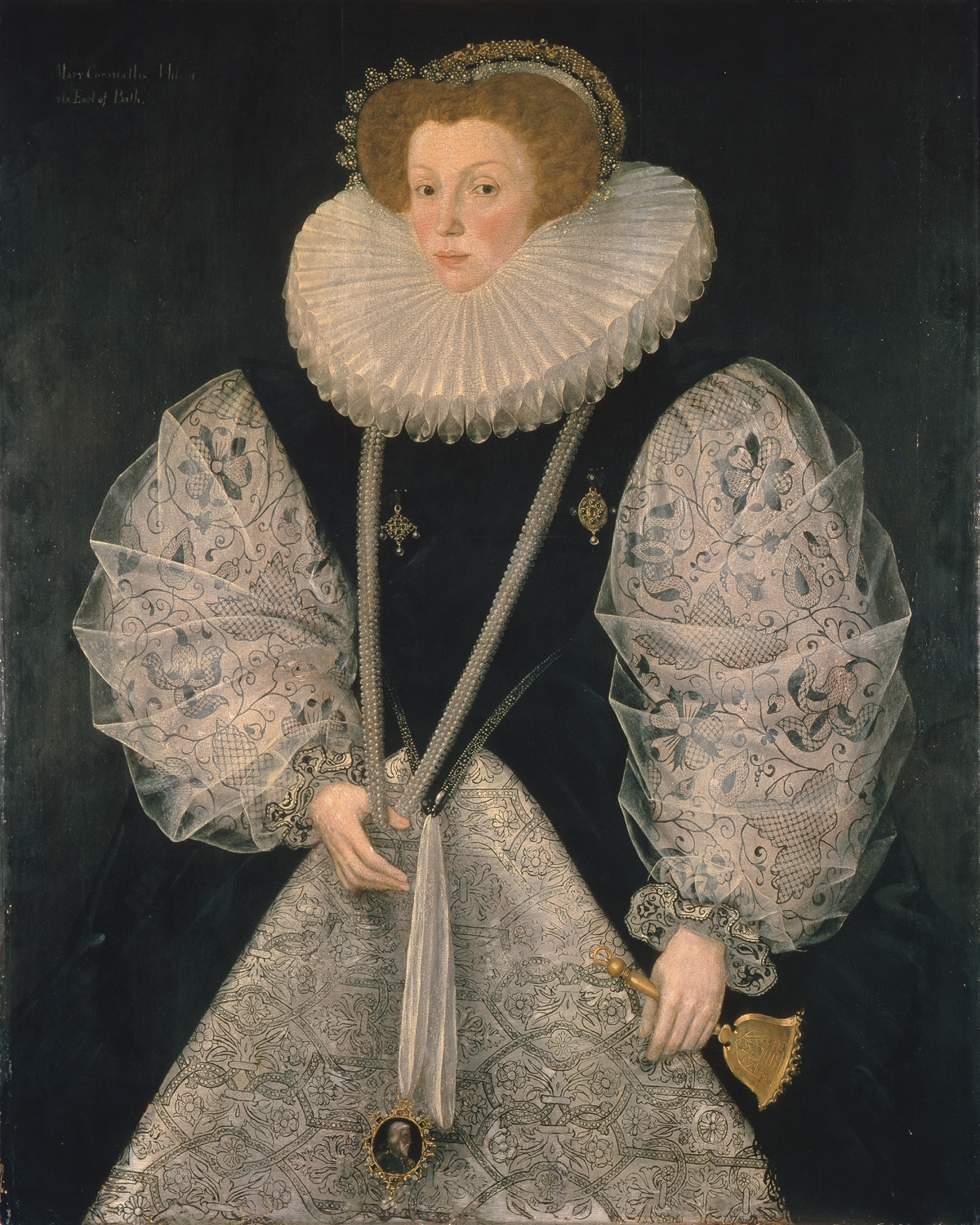
Mary Cornwallis

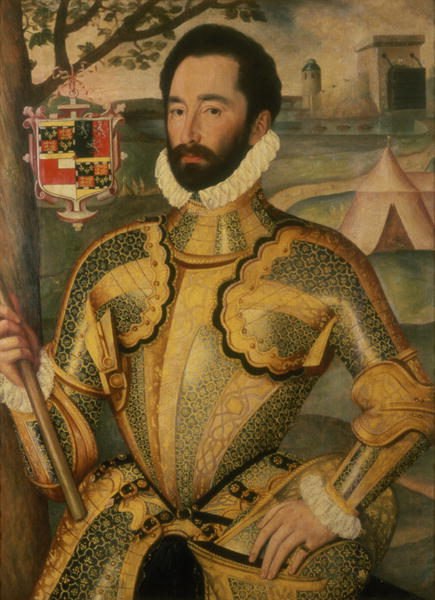
Hon. Charles Somerset

== See also ==
- Artists of the Tudor court
- Portraiture of Elizabeth I
- Serjeant Painter
