= Niccolo da Modena =

Italian artist

Niccolo da Modena or Nicholas Bellin of Modena (died 1569) was an Italian artist and technician at the English court.

== Career ==
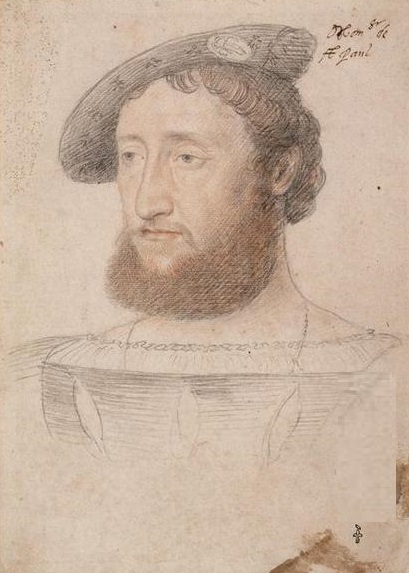
The Comte de Saint-Pol for whom Nicholas Bellin designed wedding costumes

He was born in Modena near the end of the 15th century. He is first recorded at the French court in 1516 as a valet of the wardrobe. Other painters and artists including Jean Clouet had similar court offices. He worked for several years at Fontainebleau, and came to London in 1532 where he was recorded working at Whitehall. He returned to France and made masquerade costumes for the wedding of the Comte de Saint-Pol. He returned to England in August 1537.

He came to England from the works of Francis II of France at Fontainebleau, and worked at Nonsuch Palace and Whitehall Palace for Henry VIII. He had left France under a cloud, accused of embezzling funds. The diplomat John Wallop, who had visited the Palace of Fontainebleau and written about the magnificence of its gallery, was an advocate for Bellin's employment in England.

Bellin was a painter, carver, designer and technologist. He continued to work for Edward VI. As well as decorative painting for the Tudor palaces, "Nicholas Modena" or "Moden", as he was known in England, made masque costumes, papier-mâché and boiled leather ornament, and leather horse-armour known as barding.

Nonsuch was decorated with carved and slates. In 1542 Niccolo provided a special varnish for the slates, made from "mastyke vernyshe and oyle with other necessaryes for the pollishing settyng and vernyshing".

His revels costumes included leather garments for wild men who acted as torch-bearers, equipped with helmets, staves, and clubs. He decorated a pageant stage called the "mount" with terracotta and plaster of paris ornaments and other moulding compounds. The mount was used in an interlude of Orpheus at the coronation of Edward VI.

He was paid for "six heads of hair for women masquers and for the tryming Coloring and lyning of xvj vizars or maskes for moores", for actors and dancers portraying imagined Africans. An inventory of the revels costume mentions a set of eight costumes for women disguised as "Mores", made of silver, cloth of gold, and "tilsent" with "head pieces or coiffes to the same of like stuff having perukes of here (hair) everie of them". This use of fabric to represent black skin in early modern theatre has been described a "chromatic materiality".

He made the effigy used at the funeral of Henry VIII in 1547. He made leather horse armour used against the Scots at the battle of Pinkie during the war known as the Rough Wooing. Niccolo, listed as a carver, Anthony Toto, and Nicholas Lizard attended the funeral of Edward VI.

Niccolo worked for many years in the Tomb House at Westminster Abbey. In 1559 he gave Elizabeth I a portrait of Henry VIII's fool Patch.

He died in London in 1569.

Other Italian craftsmen employed by the Tudor court include Archangelo Arcano and Giovanni da Maiano.
