= Bartolommeo Penni =

Italian painter

Bartolommeo Penni was a Florentine High Renaissance painter active in the 16th century, the brother of the painters Luca Penni and Gianfrancesco Penni - the three brothers originally came from a family of weavers. Bartolommeo moved to England with "Antony Toto" (Antonio di Nunziato d'Antonio) and served as a court artist to King Henry VIII between 1531 and 1533. He probably came to Henry from Cardinal Wolsey, as he and Toto first appear in the accounts just after Wolsey's fall in October 1529. "Toto" had been signed on in Florence in 1519 as an assistant to Pietro Torrigiano, who in fact left England for good later that year. Toto and Penni spent most of their time after 1538 working on Nonsuch Palace, including elaborate stucco work for Henry's most advanced building, now vanished. Penni is recorded as still in England in 1538 and also worked as painter-decorator to Henry's son and successor Edward VI.
