= Anthony Toto =

Italian painter

Anthony Toto or "Antony", real name Antonio di Nunziato d'Antonio (1498–1554), was an Italian painter and architect at the English court.

He was a Florentine, and a pupil of Ridolfo Ghirlandajo. He came to England about 1519, and was naturalized in 1543. He was one of a number of foreign artists of the Tudor Court, being appointed Serjeant Painter in 1543. The English evidently found his Italian name too complicated, and he is normally called "Antony Toto" (in effect "Anthony Tony") in the records. In Italian records, his name appears as "Toto di Nunziato".

== Florentine training ==
His father was Nunziata d'Antonio, a painter who died in Florence in 1525. None of his father's works survive, and little is known of his work, though he was mentioned by Vasari. A document of 1517 names Nunziata and his son Toto as witnesses to the will of a legnaiuolo named Giuseppe di Lorenzo in the parish of San Pancrazio. Nunziata was identified not as a painter but as a bombardier, Nunziato Antonii Dominici bombardiere. Apparently, as an old man he must have fallen upon hard times. It was common for out-of-work craftsmen to moonlight as bombardiers (well-known examples include Raffaello da Montelupo and Zanobi Lastricati), though it was generally the province of masters in the more physically demanding arts, such as cannon-founders, sculptors, and scalpellini. Nunziata is a rare, if not unique example of a Renaissance painter working as a bombardier.

"Toto" was registered as an assistant in Florence on 28 September 1519 to Pietro Torrigiano, who was already in England. Vasari relates that Toto had worked in the shop of Nunziata's friend Ridolfo Ghirlandaio where he had painted a number of pictures that were sent to England. His fellow shop assistant Bartolomeo Ghetti is said to have made paintings that were sent to King Francis I of France before he himself departed for the French court. Toto had a colleague Bartolommeo Penni, brother of the more well-known Gianfrancesco Penni, Raphael's right-hand man, and Luca Penni, a member of the School of Fontainebleau.

On 28 September 1519, Nunziata consented to his son Antonio, called "Toto del Nunziata", contracting to work abroad with Pietro Torrigiani for four and a half years. At this time Toto was several months past his twenty-first birthday; technically, therefore, his father's permission was not required for the contract. Nunziata may have wished to give his formal assent in order to ensure that there would be no qualms about the legitimacy of Toto's contract. On the other hand, his recollection of his son Toto's exact age may merely have been a bit shaky.

== At the Tudor court ==
Both Toto and Penni probably came to Henry VIII's service from Cardinal Wolsey, as they first appear in the accounts just after Wolsey's fall in October 1529. Henry VIII appointed him Serjeant Painter, and he died still in office under Edward VI. He was the first Serjeant Painter who can be evidenced as an artist rather than an artisan.

None of his paintings are known to survive, but his New Year gifts to Henry, presumably his own work, are documented. These include a Calumny of Apelles (1538/39) and a Story of King Alexander (1540/41), and in 1552 a portrait of a duke "steyned upon cloth of silver" for Edward VI. In March 1538 Toto's servant was paid for bringing to the king at Hampton Court Palace a "depicted table of Colonia".

In 1532, Anthony Toto and "John de la Mayn" (Giovanni da Maiano) were employed at Hanworth in Middlesex to set up "antique heads", medallions of Roman emperors. Toto and Penni probably spent time after 1538 working on Nonsuch Palace, including elaborate stucco work for Henry's most advanced building, now vanished. Anthony worked for the court revels for Henry VIII and Edward VI, and was recorded drawing "patrons" for masques, and costume designs.

Toto was married, though little seems to be known about his wife, and had at least one daughter, Winifred, who married Sir Charles Calthorpe, judge of the Court of Common Pleas (Ireland). She died in 1605. Toto's services were evidently valued by the Crown, as he died a rich man, owning among other properties the manor of Ravensbury.
