= Nicholas Lyzarde =

English painter

Nicholas Lyzarde or Lizard (died April 1571) was an English sergeant-painter.

== Biography ==
Lyzarde served as painter to the court in the time of Henry VIII, working for the revels. The accounts include his work on costumes and purchases for a masque at the Tudor court:

To Nicholas Lizarde painter ffor gyldinge of viij (8) undergarmentes ffor women of white and blew sarsenett with pertie golde and syllver iiij li (£4), ffor viij pastes for women xx d (20 pence), for viij (8) longe heddes for women made of past gylded with perte gold and sylver liij s iiij d (53 shillings 4 pence), for viij (8) round heddes cappes maid of lick (like) stuff xxij s (22 shillings), ffor viij (8) brod cappys maide of like stuff xl s (40 shillings) ffor viij stafes th' snakes xxiiij s, for xvj visars gold & syllver xl s, ffor viij hoodes liij d ffor heere (hair) by him bowght at Grynewich 6s 6d, ffor coolis (coal) and candellis by him bowght at Grynewich 6s 6d, ffor carriage of the said stuffe from London to Gryenewich, from Grenewich to London by water viij s. summa (total, £17 - 7s - 10d).

Lyzarde was "second painter" under Anthony Toto to Edward VI and Mary I. He attended the funeral of Edward VI.

His work at Somerset House in 1553 included "painting and trimming" the ceiling of the withdrawing chamber. Mary appointed him as a Sergeant Painter, with a fee of £10 a year levied on the customs.

In 1556 Lyzarde presented the queen as a New Year's Day gift "a table painted with a maundy." He decorated and gilded fountains at Greenwich Palace and Windsor Castle. The Windsor fountain included a dragon, with a giffin, a hart and a greyhound holding the royal heraldic badges, and the arms of England and Spain were displayed on the top of the structure. Some of the stonework was painted "lead colour" to match the plumbing.

Lyzarde worked on the decorations at Westminster Abbey for the funeral of Mary I and may have painted the effigy used at the ceremony. He continued to work for Elizabeth I, and in 1558 presented her on New Year's Day "a table painted of the history of Ashuerus," receiving a gilt cruse (a kind of cup) in return.

Lyzarde died in April 1571, and was buried on 5 April in the church of St Martin-in-the-Fields, London. In his will, dated 14 February 1571, he mentions five sons and four daughters, and also his wife Margaret.
