= Horenbout family =

The Horenbout family was a Flemish family of painters and miniaturists. Known members are Gerard Horenbout (c. 1465 – 1541), and his two children Lucas Horenbout and Susanna Horenbout.
