= Horenbout =

Horenbout or Hornebolt is a surname. Notable people with the surname include:

- Gerard Horenbout (c.1465–c.1541), Flemish miniaturist
- Lucas Horenbout (c.1490/1495–1544), Flemish artist
- Susannah Horenbout (1503–c.1554), English artist
