= Levina Teerlinc =

Flemish painter (1510-1576)

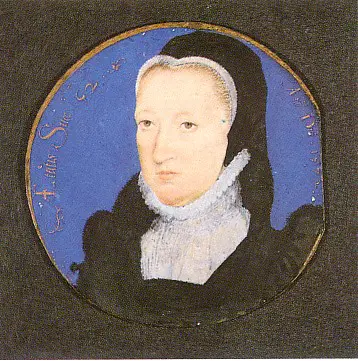
Miniature portrait, possibly of Levina Teerlinc, painted by Nicholas Hilliard in 1572, when the lady in the picture was 52 years of age. Buccleuch Collection

Levina Teerlinc (1510s – 23 June 1576) was a Flemish Renaissance miniaturist who served as a painter to the English court of Henry VIII, Edward VI, Mary I and Elizabeth I. She was the most important miniaturist at the English court between Hans Holbein the Younger and Nicholas Hilliard. Her father, Simon Bening, was a renowned book illuminator and miniature painter of the Ghent-Bruges school and probably trained her as a manuscript painter. She may have worked in her father's workshop before her marriage.

== Biography ==
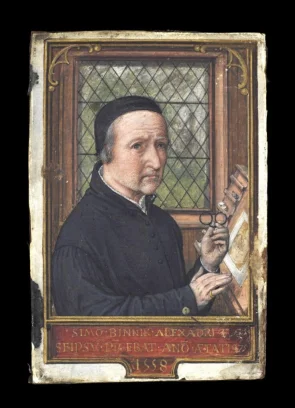
Self-portrait by Simon Bening, Levina Teerlinc's father

Teerlinc was born in Bruges, Flanders (which is now a part of Belgium) in the 1510s, one of five daughters of renowned miniaturist Simon Bening and granddaughter of Catherine van der Goes (closely related to Hugo van der Goes) and Alexander Bening. After marrying George Teerlinc of Blanckenberge in 1545, Teerlinc left for England, and is documented there by 1546, when she became court painter to the Tudor court, serving Henry VIII, Edward VI, Mary I, and Elizabeth I. She received an annual salary of £40 from 1546 until her death in 1576, as granted by Henry VIII and recorded by Lodovico Guicciardini (1567), which was more than was provided to Holbein.

Levina died before she was able to acquire her last £10, Queen Elizabeth was able to give this to her husband as a "gift". It is thought to have been rewarding the Teerlincs for their loyalty to her during the reign of Mary. She was the only female painter in the court of Henry VIII, although Catherine Parr was said to have employed three women miniature painters and these were Susannah Hornebolt, Levina Teerlinc and Margaret Holsewyther.

In English records her name was recorded in a variety of spellings, including in 1552 "Mrs Sevin Tilney, paintrix". Queen Mary gave her a New Year's day gift of a gilt silver salt in 1556 and she gave the queen a small picture of the Trinity. In 1559 Teerlinc was appointed tutor in painting to the King's daughter at the Spanish Court. She and her husband had one son, Marcus. She died in Stepney, London on 23 June 1576.

== Reputation ==
Art historian Louisa Woodville writes:

Teerlinc's contemporaries were impressed by her work. The sixteenth-century Florentine historian Lodovico Guicciardini heralds Teerlinc as the best of the women painters practicing at the time. Seventy-five years later, Flemish historian Antonius Sanderus assured his readers that she was "very capable in the two specialties of art."

== Works ==
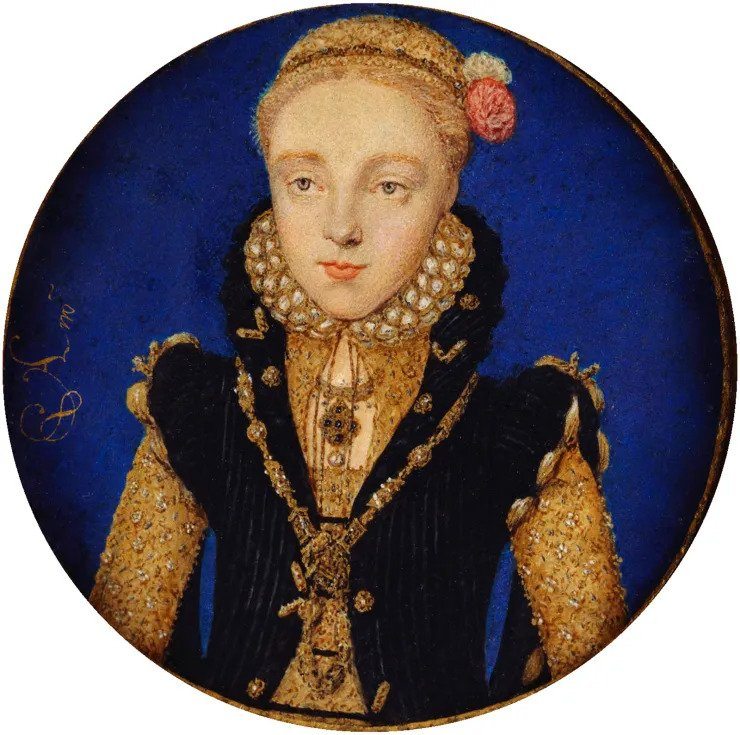
Portrait of Elizabeth I attributed to Levina Teerlinc, c. 1560–1565. The Royal Collection. The likeness the sitter bears to those in miniatures of Katherine Grey, Countess of Hertford, has led to many suggestions that Lady Katherine Grey may be the sitter instead

No surviving works have been confirmed as Teerlinc's. Yet she was one of the most well-documented artists at court in miniature painting, providing various portraits of Elizabeth I in the years 1559, 1562, 1563, 1564, 1567 ("a full-length portrait"), 1568 ("with Knights of the Order"), 1575 ("with other personages"), and 1576. She also painted for Mary I in 1556 as a New Year gift "a small picture of the trynitie". Teerlinc is best known for her pivotal position in the rise of the portrait miniature. She might have trained Nicholas Hilliard, by training a goldsmith, in the methods of miniature portraiture.

Attributing Teerlinc's works is challenging because she did not always sign them. However, there are a few existing paintings that are suspected to be Teerlinc's due to the fact she was the only active miniaturist of prominence in English court between Hans Holbein the Younger in 1543 and Nicholas Hilliard in the 1570s. Some scholars also speculate that many of the miniatures were lost in the fire at Whitehall.

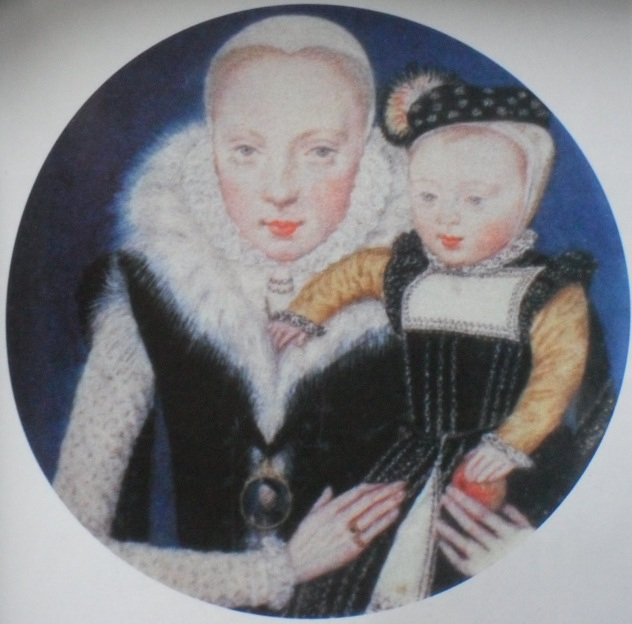
Katherine Grey, Countess of Hertford with her eldest son Edward Seymour, Lord Beauchamp, by Levina Teerlinc. Late 1562 or early 1563. Private collection

A 1983 exhibition at the Victoria and Albert Museum represented "the first occasion when a group of miniatures has been assembled which can be attributed to Levina Teerlinc". Since the exhibition also performed the same function for her predecessor as court miniaturist, Lucas Hornebolte, it was especially useful in developing consensus on attributions. Five miniatures and two illuminated manuscript sheets were in the group, including a miniature of Lady Katherine Grey from the V&A, and others from the Yale Center for British Art, the Royal Collection (both of these possibly of the young Elizabeth I, and private collections). Strong considered there was "a convincing group of miniatures that emerge as the work of a single hand, one whose draughtsmanship is weak, whose paint is thin and transparent and whose brushwork loose". She also probably designed the Great Seal of England for Mary I and the earliest one used by Elizabeth (in the 1540s).

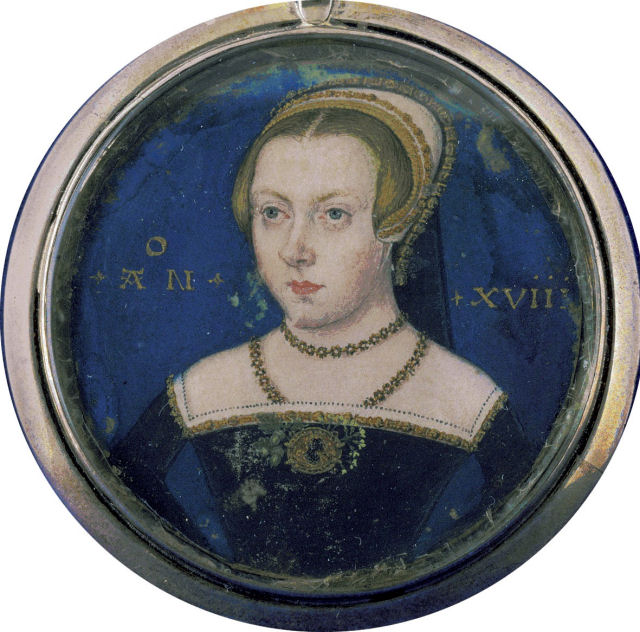
Possible portrait miniature of Amy Robsart on the occasion of her wedding, 1550, (Note: There have been several tentative identifications of this miniature. One theory is that it is a wedding picture of Lady Jane Grey, Amy Robsart's sister-in-law. Eric Ives argues that it cannot be Jane Grey because (among other considerations) she was too young, and says: "If the sitter was a Dudley wife and the miniature is a wedding memento, the acorns suggest Amy Robsart, who married ... at the precise age of 18 (Robert, robur, Latin for oak)." (Ives 2009 pp. 295, 15–16). Chris Skidmore concurs with this, adding that Robert Dudley used the oak as a personal symbol in his youth (Skidmore 2010 p. 21).) by Levina Teerlinc. In the Yale Center for British Art

=== Partial list of works ===
==== Victoria and Albert Museum ====
- Levina Teerlinc, Portrait of Lady Katherine Grey, ca. 1555–1560, Museum no. P.10-1979
- Levina Teerlinc, Portrait of a Young Woman, 1566, Museum no. P.21-1954
- Levina Teerlinc, Portrait of Mary Dudley, Lady Sidney, ca.1575, Museum no. E.1170-1988

==== Other ====
- Levina Teerlinc?, Portrait of Queen Mary I, Duke of Buccleuch's collection
- Levina Teerlinc?, Portrait of a Young Woman, Royal Collection, Windsor Castle
- Levina Teerlinc?, Portrait of Elizabeth I in State Robes, Welbeck Abbey collection

== Gallery ==
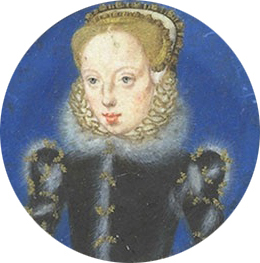
Katherine Grey, Countess of Hertford by Levina Teerlinc, c. 1555-1560. The Victoria and Albert Museum, P.10&A-1979

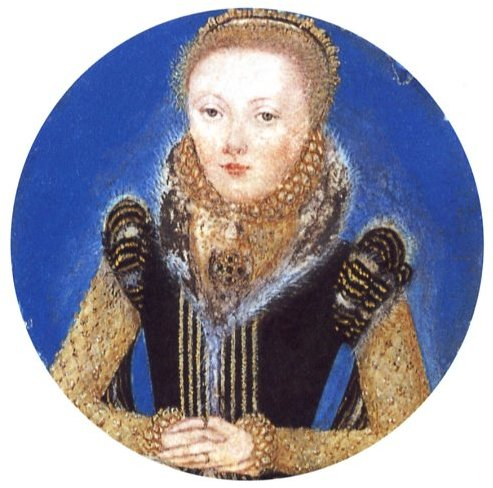
Portrait of Elizabeth I attributed to Levina Teerlinc, c. 1565. The Royal Collection

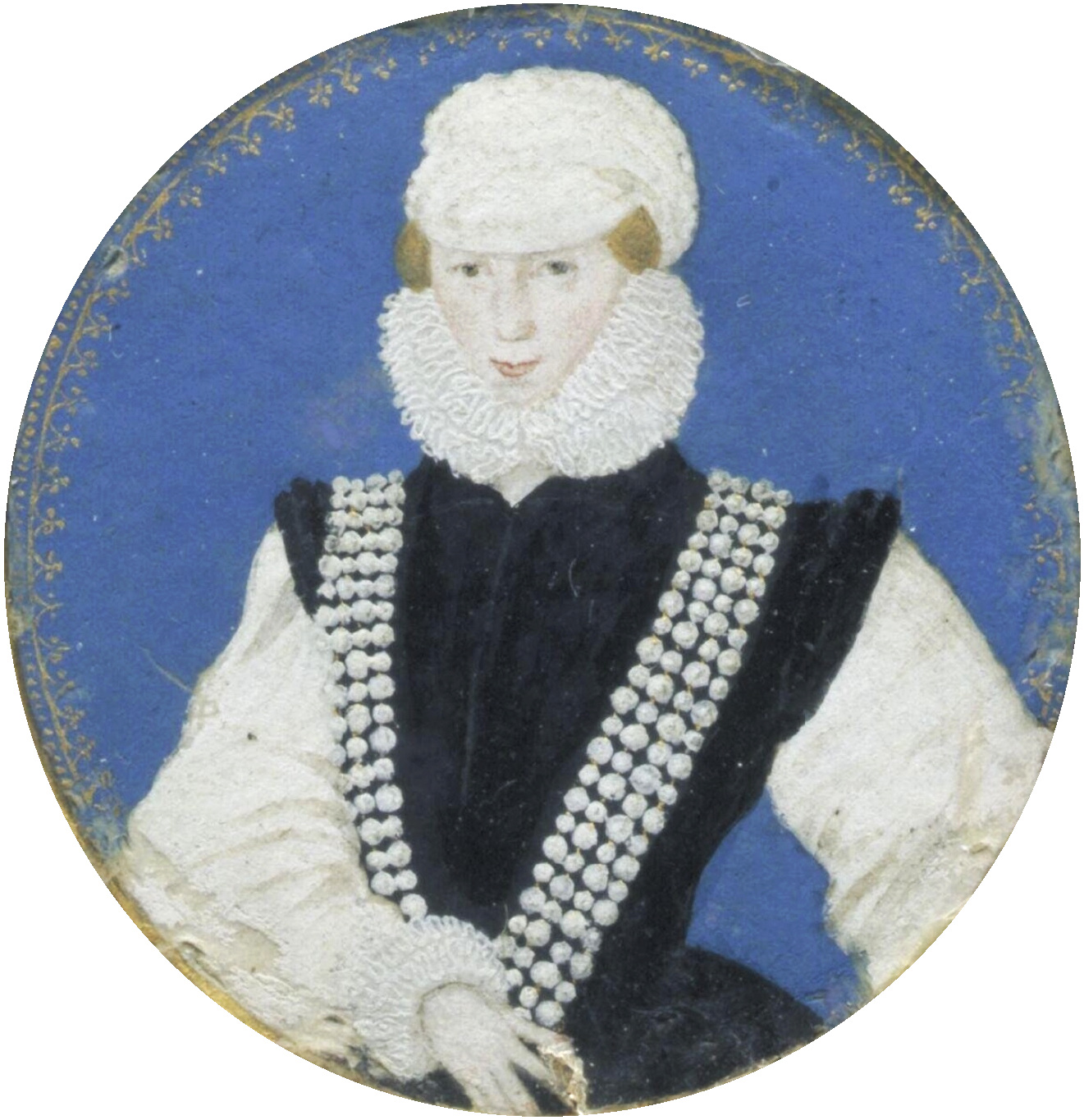
Mary Dudley, Lady Sidney by Levina Teerlinc, c. 1575. The Victoria and Albert Museum, E.1170-1988

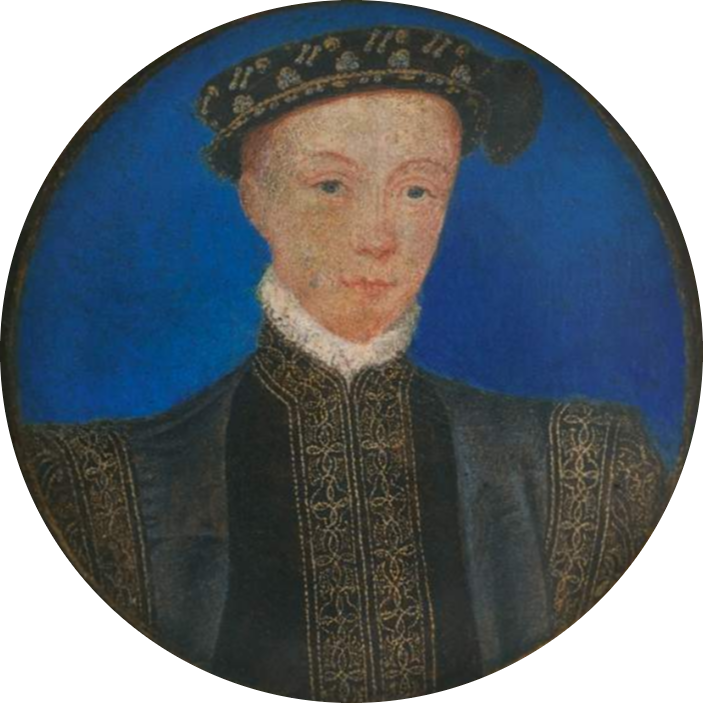
Edward VI by Levina Teerlinc. After William Scrots's portrait of the young King of c. 1550

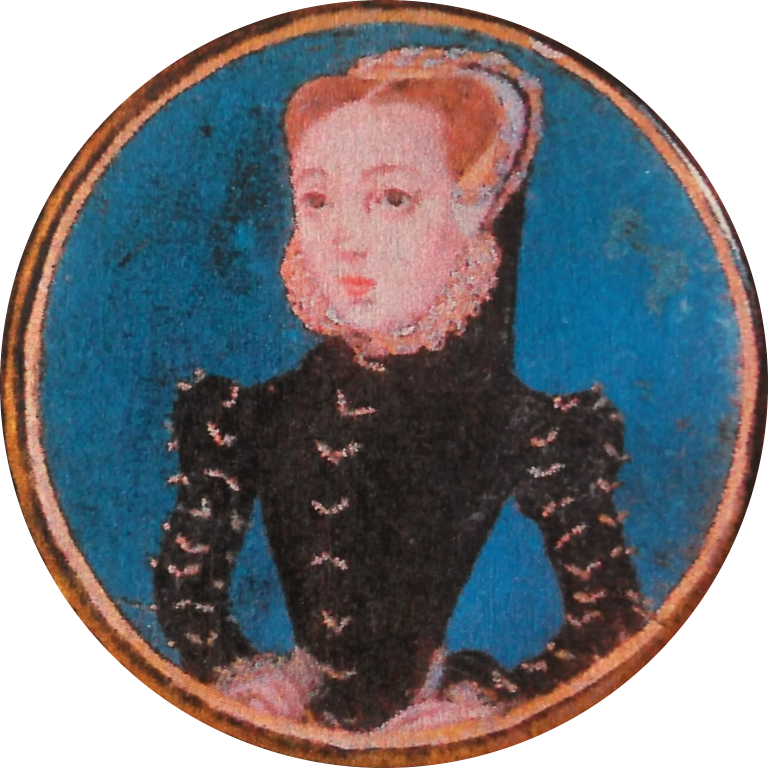
Amy Robsart – The Beaufort Miniature by Levina Teerlinc, c. 1559. (Note: "Second half of the second half of the 1550's") Private Collection

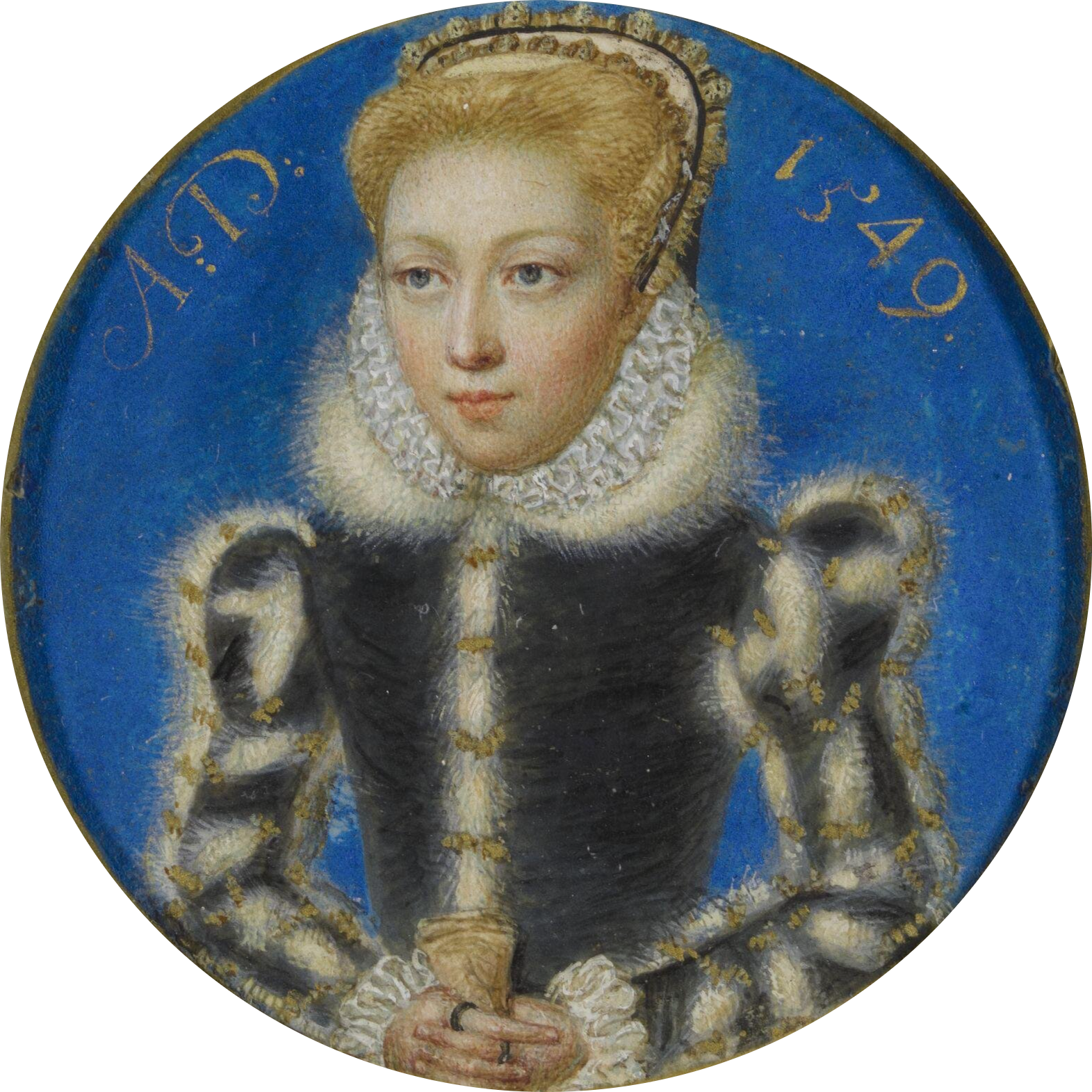
Katherine Grey, Countess of Hertford by Levina Teerlinc. The Victoria and Albert Museum, P.21-1954. Heavily overpainted. The date of '1549' is a later addition and the costume is typical of Mary's reign which would accord with the age of the sitter, about fifteen to twenty, circa 1555-60

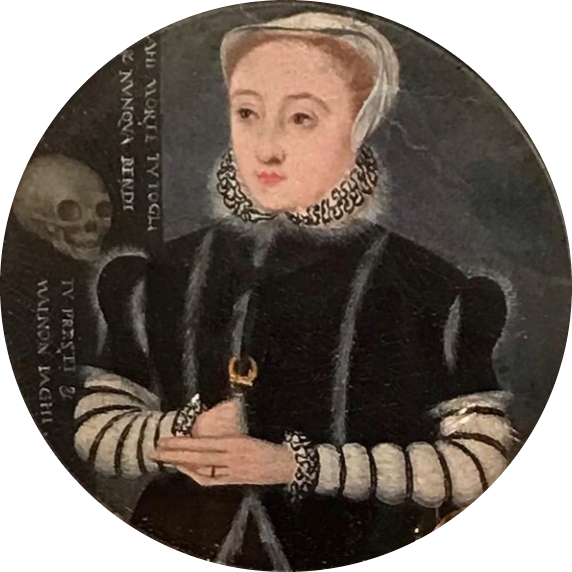
Elizabeth I when a Princess by Levina Teerlinc, c. 1551. The Paine Miniature. In October 1551 Levina Teerlinc was sent with her husband to the Princess Elizabeth 'to drawe out her picture'

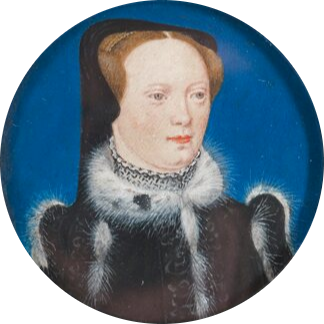
Mary Neville, Lady Dacre by Levina Teerlinc

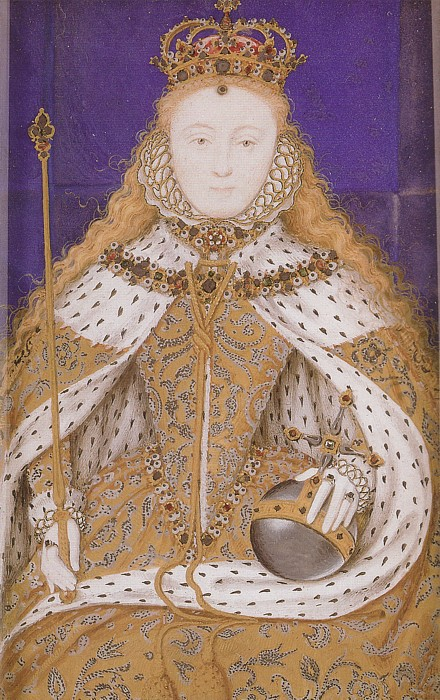
The Coronation Miniature – Portrait of Elizabeth I in State Robes. Welbeck Abbey Collection, formerly in the collection of the Duke of Portland.

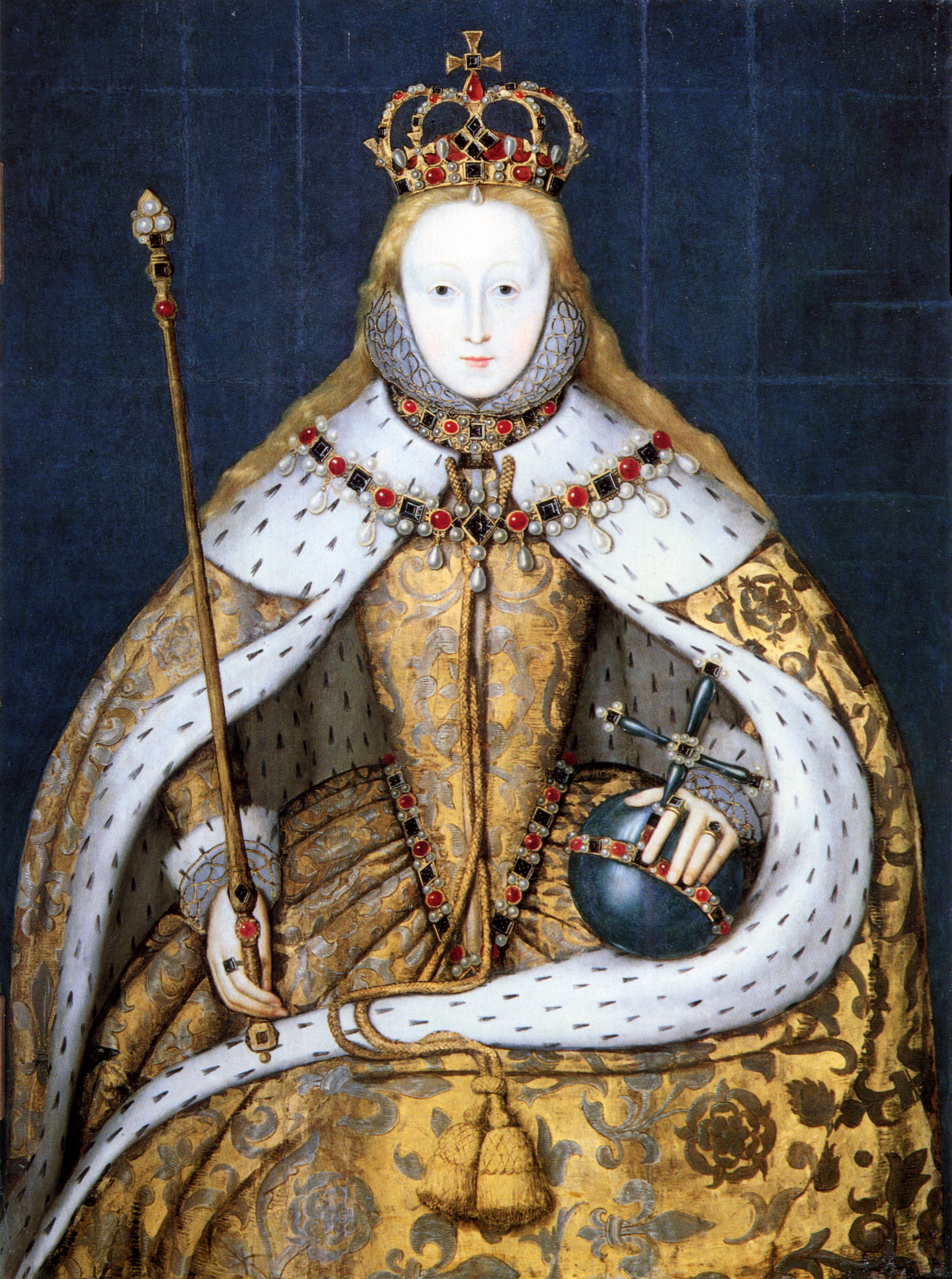
Portrait of Elizabeth I of England in her coronation robes. Copy c. 1600–1610 of a lost original of c. 1559

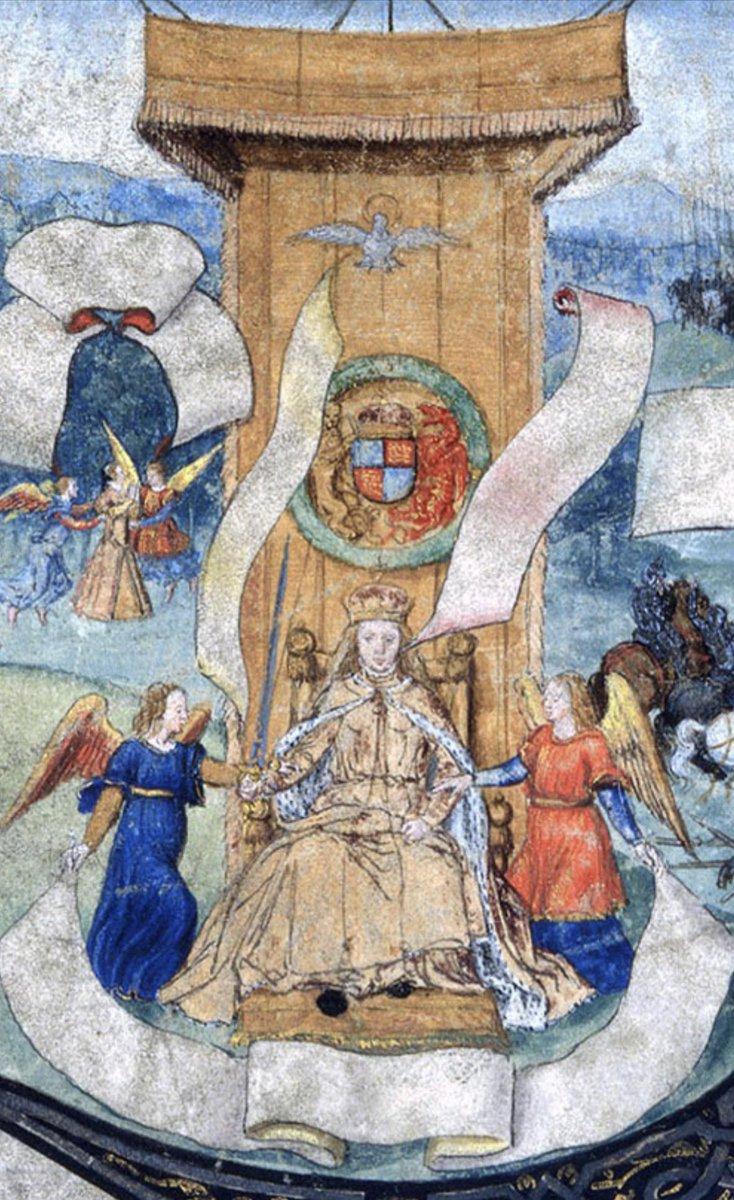
Levina Teerlinc, Mary I with Figures in Landscape, Court of King's Bench, Coram Rege Rolls. Michaelmas, 1553

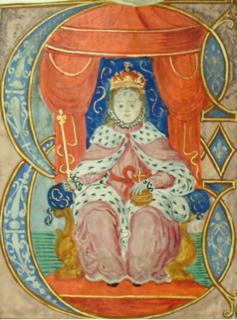
Levina Teerlinc, Indenture between the Queen, Elizabeth I, and the Dean and Canons of St. George's Chapel, Windsor, 30 August 1559

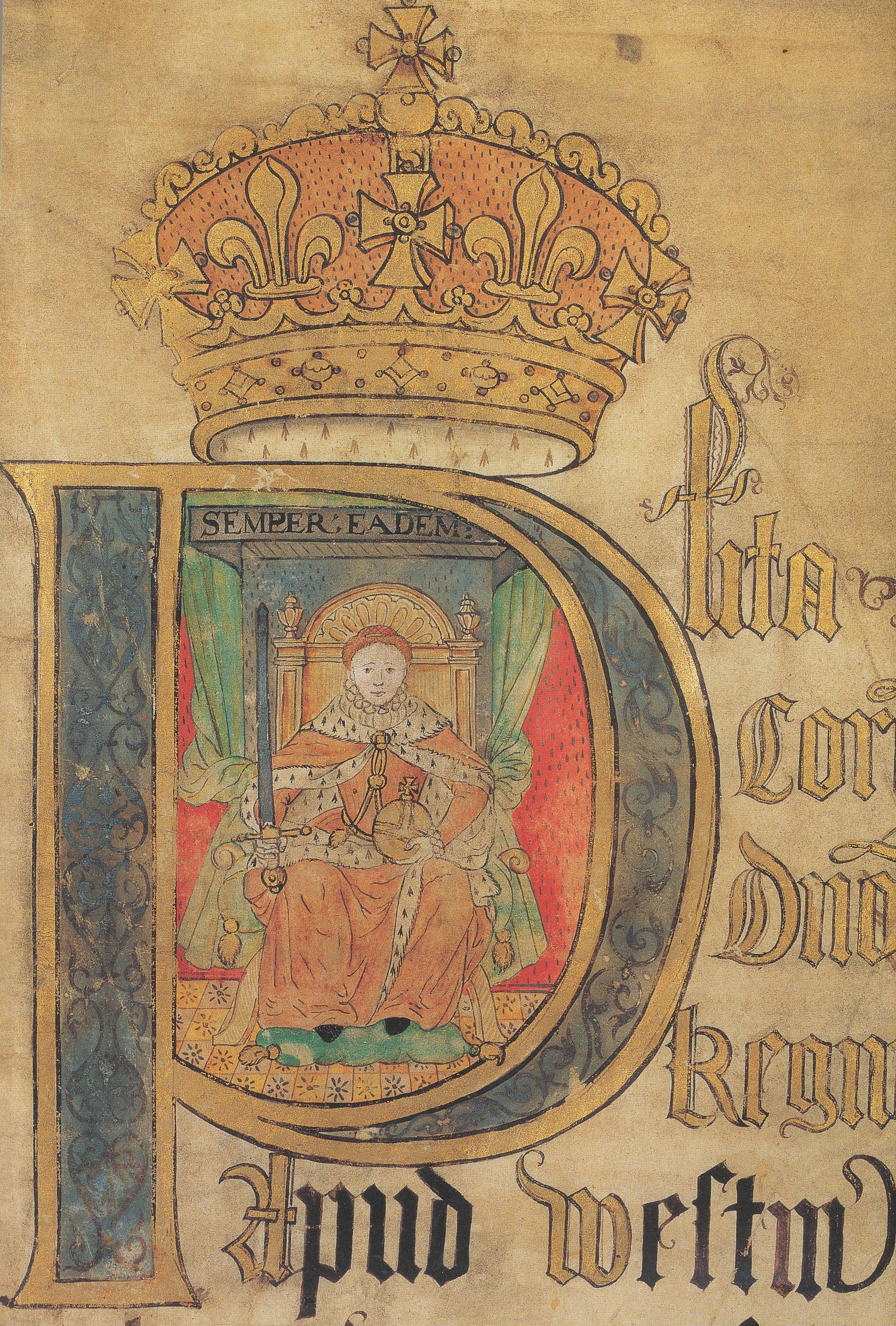
Elizabeth I, Court of King's Bench, Coram Rege Roll. Easter Term, 1572

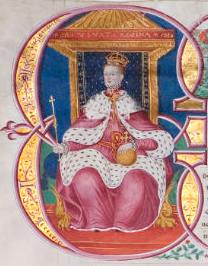
Illuminated Royal Letters Patent, 1571. Elizabeth I by Levina Teerlinc on this document, on vellum, recording the elevation of William Cecil to the peerage as Lord Burghley

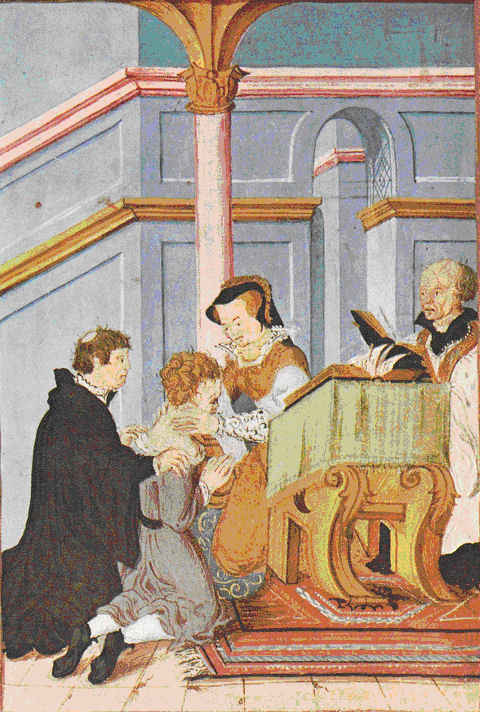
Mary I "healing" scrofula by touch. A 16th-century illustration by the Queen's miniaturist Levina Teerlinc from Queen Mary's manual for blessing cramp rings and touching for Evil. Before 1558

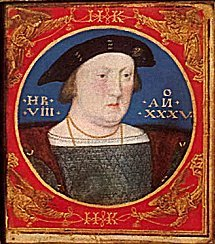
Henry VIII. A recent technical analysis has shown that this miniature was painted by the same hand as the Yale Miniature

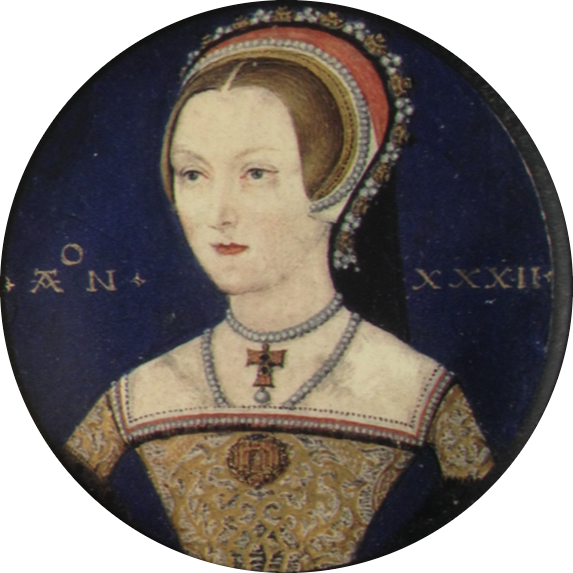
Katherine Parr by Levina Teerlinc. The Sudeley Miniature

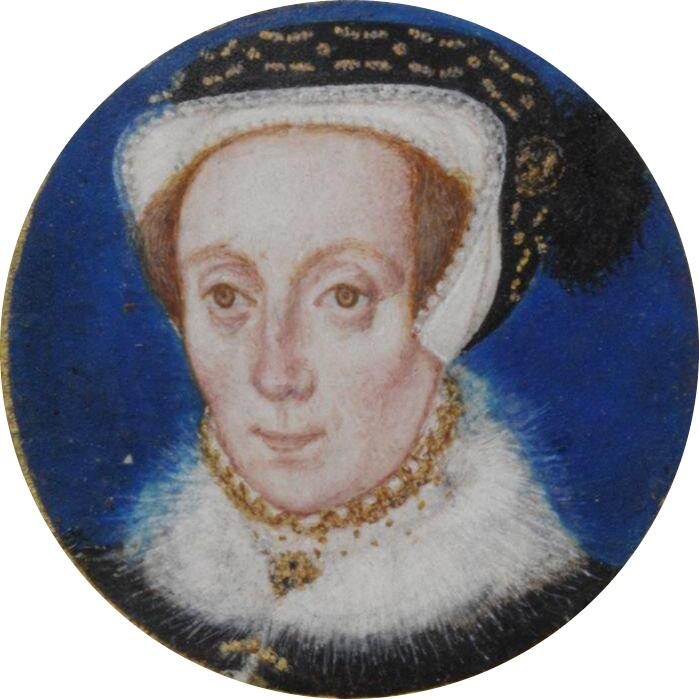
Katherine Brydges, Lady Dudley by Levina Teerlinc, c. 1560. A courtier to both Mary I and Elizabeth I. The daughter of John Brydges, 1st Baron Chandos and the wife of Edward Sutton, 4th Baron Dudley

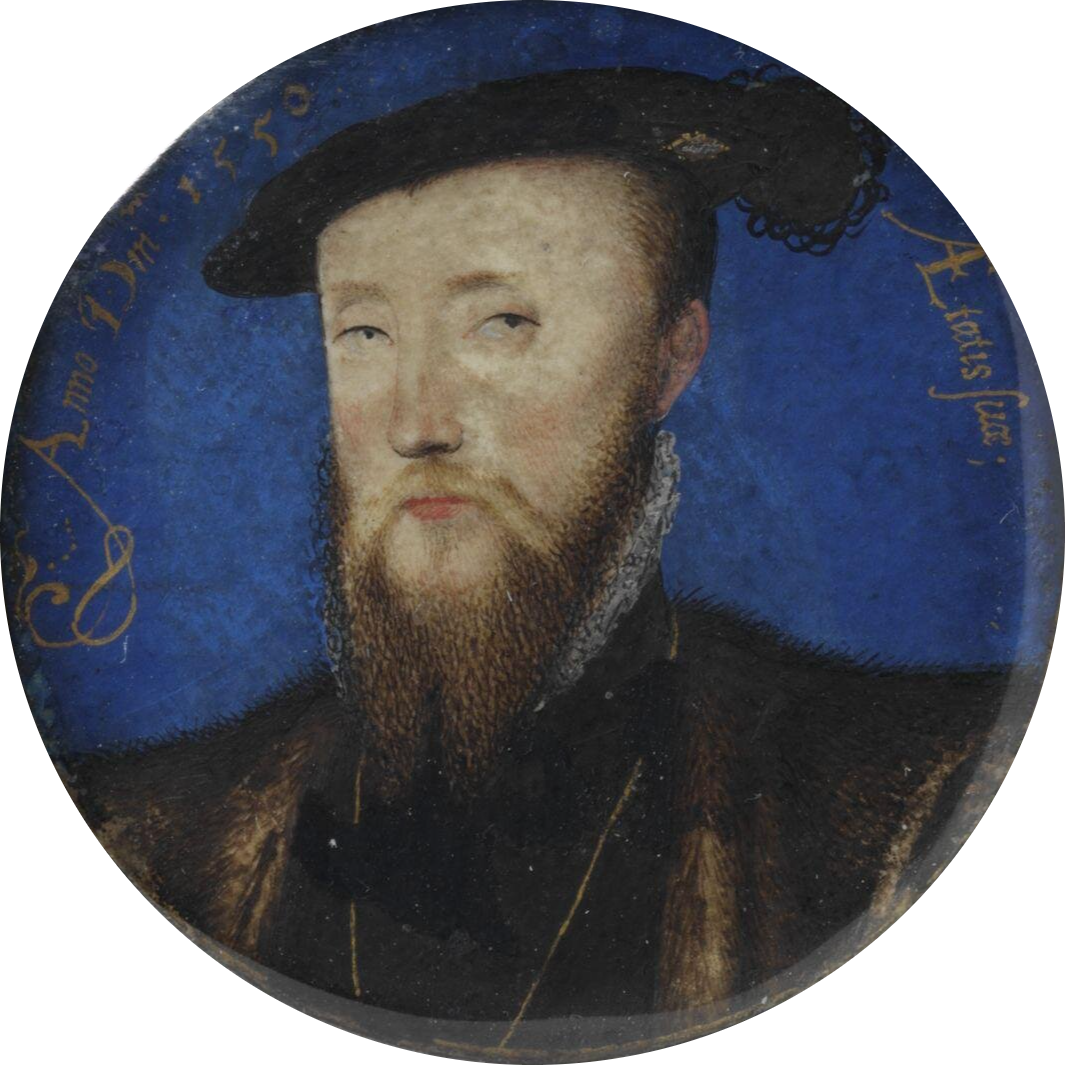
Edward Seymour, 1st Earl of Hertford and 1st Duke of Somerset, 1550s

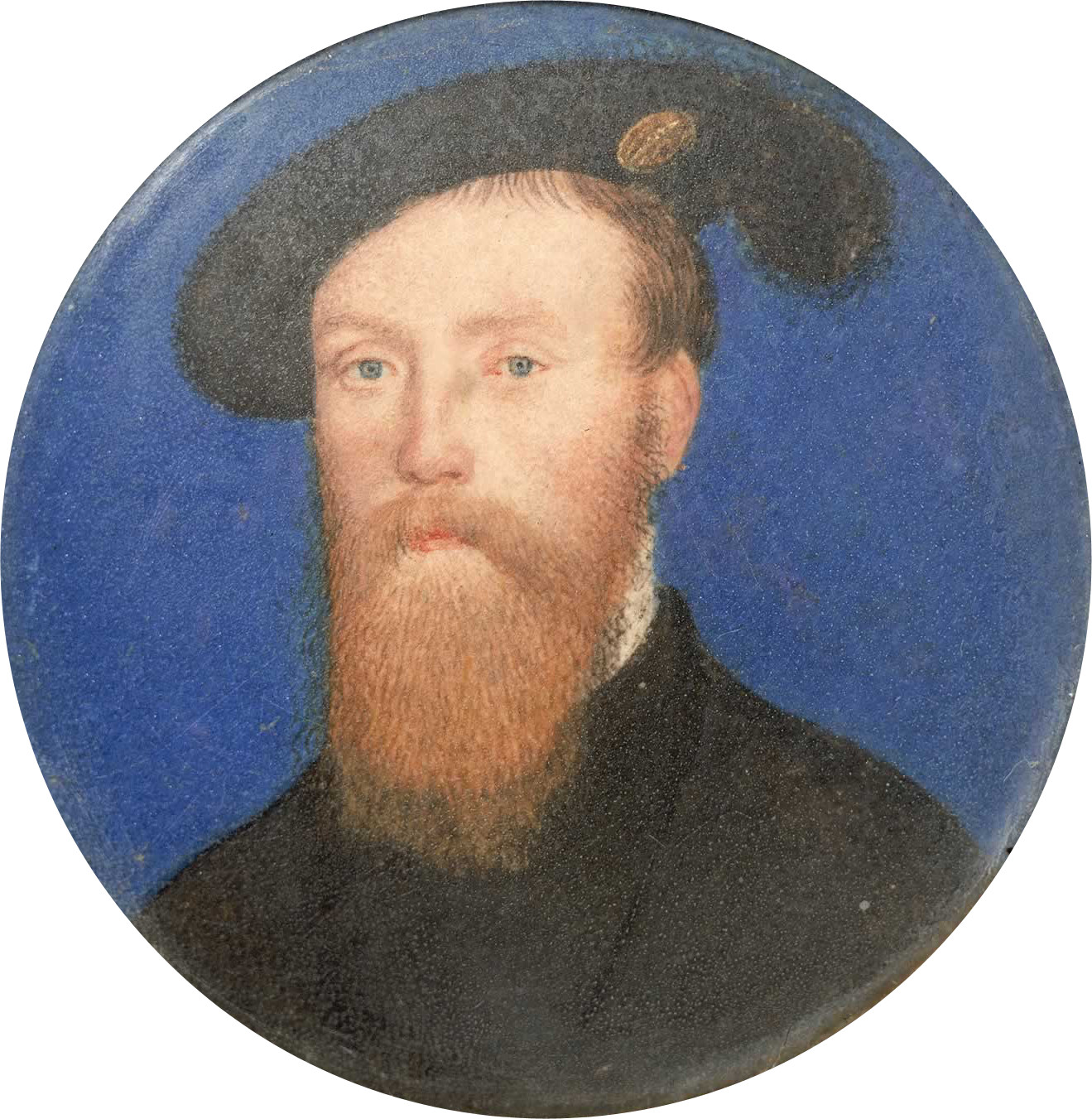
Thomas Seymour, 1st Baron Seymour of Sudeley, c. 1545–1547

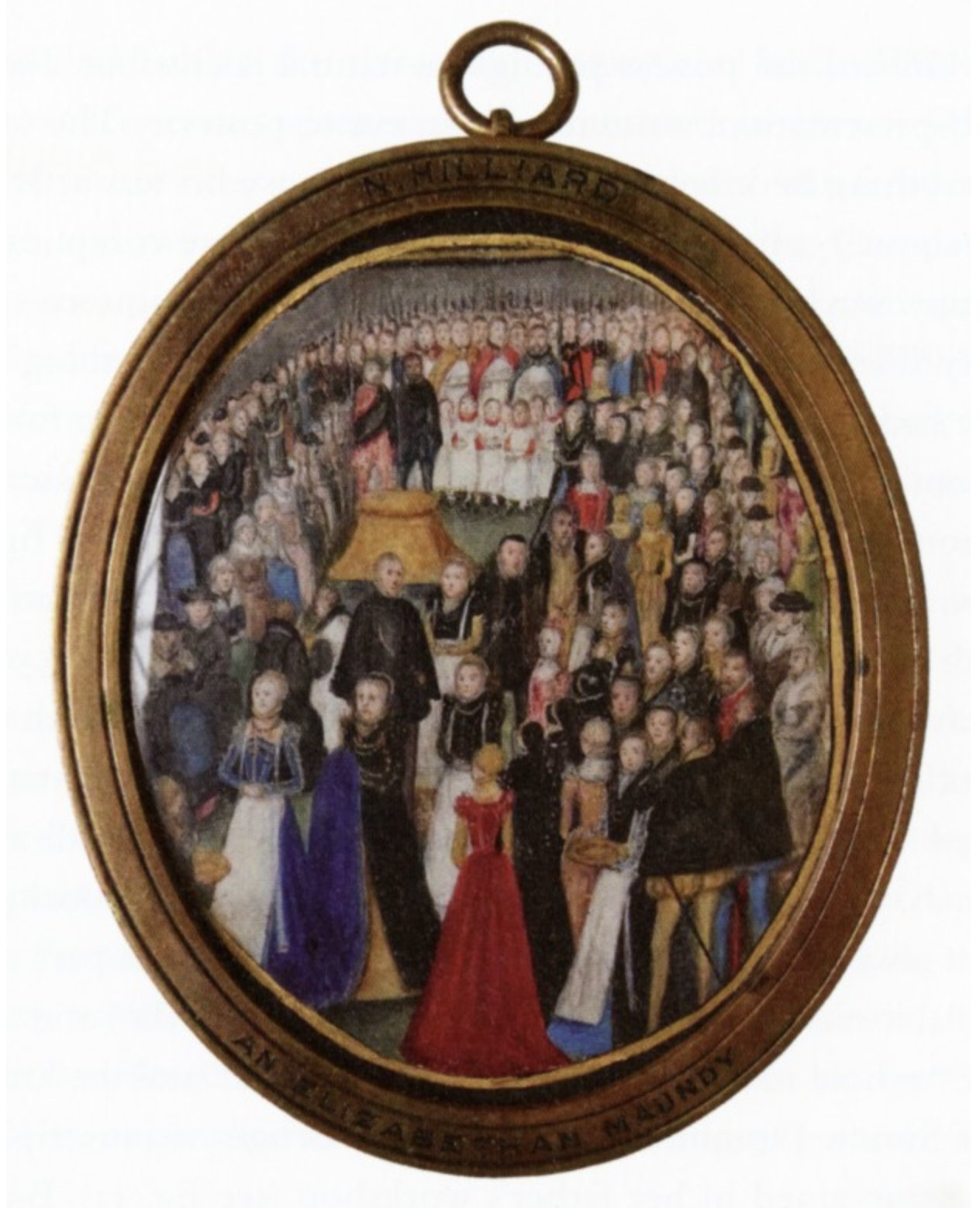
An Elizabethan Maundy, miniature by Levina Teerlinc, c. 1560

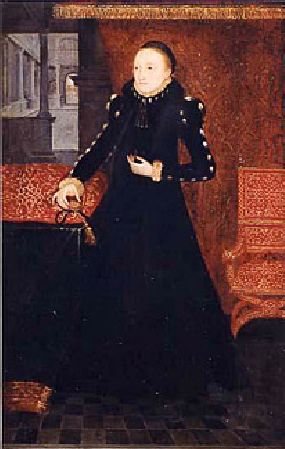
Elizabeth I, c. 1559. Has the spindly arms identified by Strong

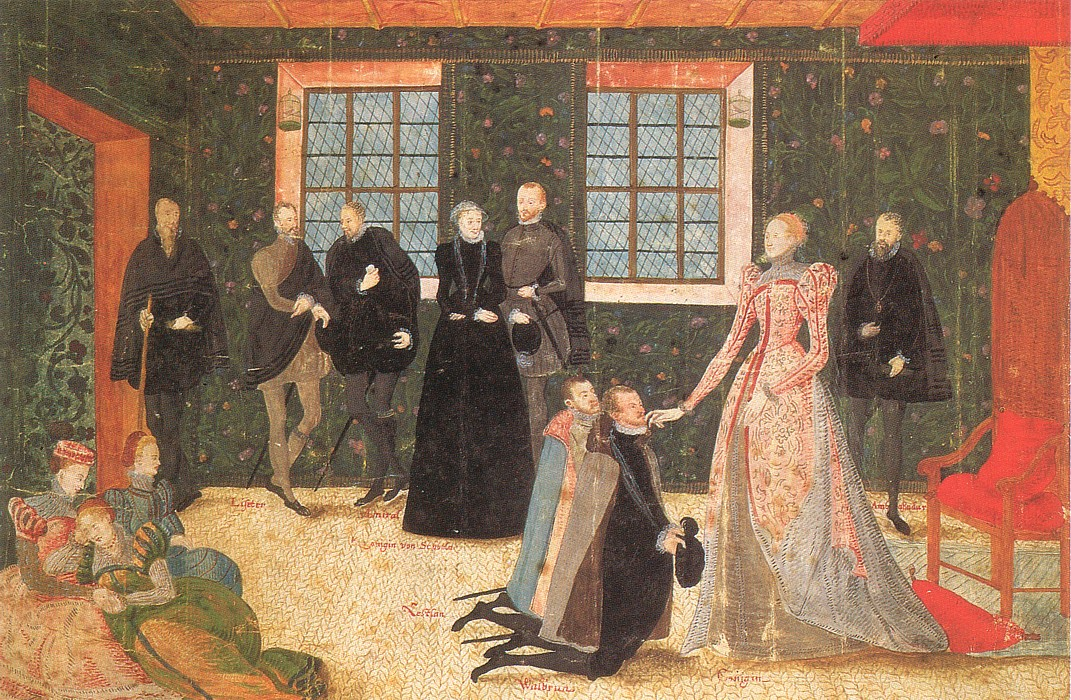
Queen Elizabeth I of England receives Dutch ambassadors, attributed to Levina Teerlinc, c. 1560
