= Margaret Holsewyther =

- Born: 1504; England
- Died: after 1560
- Known for: miniature Royal portraits
- Spouse(s): 1. Lucas Horenbout; 2. Hugh Haward; 3. Hans or John Hunt

Margaret Holsewyther (c. 1504 – after 1560) was an English miniaturist employed by Tudor monarchs. Her husbands were paid for her work making the provenance of her work difficult to ascertain. She was working over the reigns of four monarchs and three husbands.

== Life ==
Holsewyther was probably born in England in 1504.

In about 1525 she married Lucas Horenbout from Ghent. Her husband is documented as being in England in September 1525, when he was paid by the King as "pictor maker". By 1531 he was described as the "King's Painter", and this appointment was confirmed for life in June 1534, when he became effectively a naturalised citizen. Lucas Horenbout was very well paid and they and their daughter, Jacquemine, lived in a "tenement" in Charing Cross. The studio had four foreign journeyman. Lucas died in London, and was buried at Saint Martin in the Fields. Her husband left his studio to be divided between Margaret and their daughter in a 2:1 ratio. For many years after his death "his" studio was paid by Katherine Parr for miniatures that Margaret presumably created.

The studio's sales included being paid sixty shillings three years later by Queen Katherine Parr for some paintings. Margaret then remarried and within months her new husband, Hugh Haward, was paid another sixty shillings for paintings of the King and Queen, but there is no evidence that her new husband was a painter.

Margaret Holsewyther and her studio were creating several miniature paintings of Katherine Parr and the future King Edward VI. Katherine was giving away these portraits like calling cards to those she wished to influence. Katherine Parr was said to have employed three women miniature painters and these were Susannah Hornebolt, Levina Teerlinc and Margaret Holsewyther.

She married again on 18 November 1560 after her husband had left his estate to her. She married the armourer Hans or John Hunt who worked for Queen Elizabeth I. Details of her death are unknown.

== Investigations ==
Margaret Holsewyther and other wives of Tudor artists who ran studios have been discovered in recent research. The research methods used have been questioned as it is not clear whether some of the wives ran studios as a business without getting involved in the painting.
