= Lucas Horenbout =

English painter (1490s–1544)

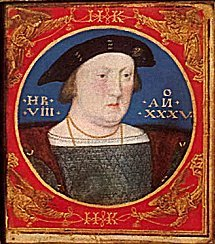
Portrait miniature of Henry VIII, 1525–26, by Lucas Horenbout, from a charter in the Fitzwilliam Museum

Lucas Horenbout, often called Hornebolte in England (c. 1490/1495 – 1544), was a Flemish artist who moved to England in the mid-1520s and worked there as "King's Painter" and court miniaturist to King Henry VIII from 1525 until his death. He was trained in the final phase of Netherlandish illuminated manuscript painting, in which his father Gerard was an important figure, and was the founding painter of the long and distinct English tradition of portrait miniature painting. He has been suggested as the Master of the Cast Shadow Workshop, who produced royal portraits on panel in the 1520s or 1530s.

== Life and family ==
Horenbout was born in Ghent, where he trained with his father, Gerard Horenbout, becoming a master of the local Guild of Saint Luke in 1512. Gerard was an important Flemish manuscript illuminator in the dying days of that art-form, who had been court painter, from 1515 to about 1522, to Margaret of Austria, regent of the Netherlands. Margaret was twice sister-in-law to Catherine of Aragon, who was married to King Henry VIII of England when the Horenbouts came to England. Gerard is sometimes identified with the "Master of James IV of Scotland", one of the many artistic personalities identified as a significant illuminator in the Ghent-Bruges school of the period, to whom no historical person can be attached.

Horenbout came over to England at an unknown date with, or perhaps before, his sister Susannah Hornebolt and his father. It has been suggested that their move was in connection with an attempt by the King, or possibly Cardinal Wolsey, to revive English manuscript illumination by establishing a workshop in London, but this is controversial. In about 1525 he married Margaret Holsewyther who was an artist of German descent who had probably been born in England.

His father Gerard is first recorded in England in 1528, and later returned to the Continent, probably after 1531; he had died in Ghent by 1540. Susanna, who was also an illuminator, is recorded in 1529 as married to a John Palmer and in England. Lucas is documented in England from September 1525, when he was first paid by the King as "pictor maker". By 1531 he was described as the "King's Painter", and this appointment was confirmed for life in June 1534, when he became a "denizen" - effectively a naturalised citizen. Horenbout was very well paid, at sixty-two pounds and ten shillings (but only thirty-three pounds and six shillings according to Richard Gay) per year, a "huge" sum according to Strong, and better than Holbein's thirty pounds a year in his period as Henry's court painter. He was granted a "tenement" in Charing Cross, and permitted to take on four foreign journeyman. Lucas died in London, and was buried at Saint Martin in the Fields and left a wife and daughter, Margaret and Jacquemine. Margaret's sales included being paid sixty shillings three years later by Queen Catherine Parr for some paintings.

Margaret is credited with a number of paintings during his lifetime and one of Catherine Parr was attributed to him but it was painted after his death. He had left his studio to be unequally divided between his wife and his daughter. For many years his studio was paid by Catherine Parr for miniatures that his wife presumably created.

== Work ==
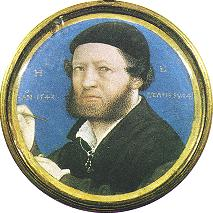
Hans Holbein the Younger, 1543, Horenbout copied a self-portrait drawing.

He can be said to be the founder of the English school of portrait miniature painting, which begins suddenly at the time of his arrival in England, and had very few continental precedents, although three lost miniatures, possibly by Jean Clouet, sent from the French to the English court, may have inspired the new form. Horenbout later taught the art of illumination to Hans Holbein the Younger, also a court artist of Henry, at least according to Karel van Mander who refers to a "Lucas", assumed to be Horenbout. However, this has been doubted.

Twenty-three surviving portrait miniatures have usually been attributed to Horenbout in recent decades; all but one, a portrait of Holbein, are of members of the English or other royal families. Paintings of at least four of Henry's Queens are attributed to him. A high proportion of those capable of being dated come from the 1520s.

Horenbout's miniature of Holbein (1543) is among his most accomplished works, not least because he copies the face from a self-portrait drawing by Holbein; his own drawing skills are not the strongest. This miniature was also nearly always regarded as a self-portrait, until recent technical examination made clear that the style of painting is actually very different from that of undoubted Holbein miniatures: there is "an absence of his subtle gradations of flesh tone and colour" and "no sign of the extremely thin pen-like lines which are so notable a feature in Holbein's drawing of such details as the embroidered edges of costume". There are two versions attributed to Horenbout, of which the better is in the Wallace Collection It may be a memorial portrait, painted in the six months interval between the death of Holbein and that of Horenbout.

He is recorded as working in other forms, probably including panel paintings, woodcuts and decorations for festivities, but there are no certain survivals from these, except for illuminations on documents. Roy Strong linked Horenbout with an artist known only as the Master of the "Cast Shadow Workshop", who produced a series of rather undistinguished portraits mostly of English monarchs past and present, presumably working for the King.

Illuminated decorations on some charters, Acts and similar royal documents are also attributed to him, and an illuminated manuscript with two elaborate full-page miniatures at Hatfield House has been attributed to him or his sister. More tentatively, some illuminations from the major Sforza Hours have been attributed to one of the two. Unlike that of Levina Teerlinc a generation later, Susanna's oeuvre, and that of another brother, remains obscure, although Albrecht Dürer records buying a miniature by her in Antwerp in May 1521. Fine illuminations in a collection of works by John Lydgate (British Library) and the Letters Patent for Cardinal College (Public Record Office), Cardinal Wolsey's foundation in Oxford, renamed Christ Church after his fall, are attributed to one or more of Gerard, Lucas and Susanna, without specifying which one or ones.

== Gallery ==
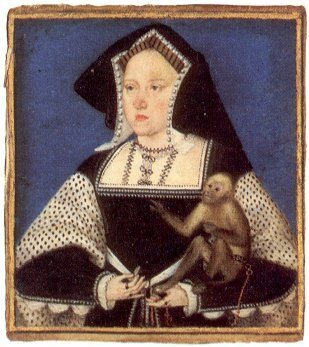
Catherine of Aragon with a monkey, 1525–26

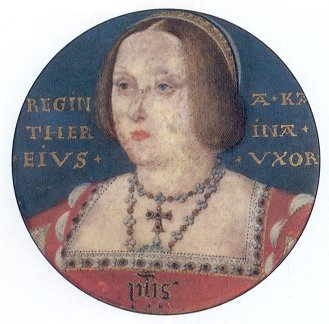
Catherine of Aragon, 1525–26

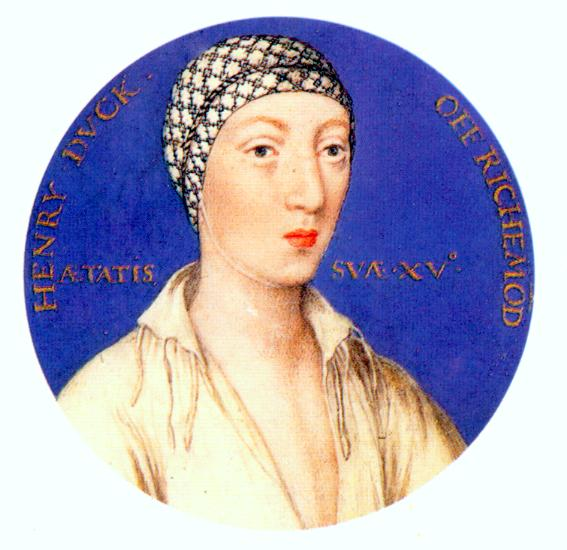
Henry FitzRoy, 1st Duke of Richmond and Somerset, Henry VIII's illegitimate son, 1534-5

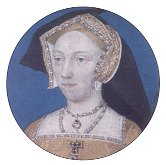
Jane Seymour, 1536–37

== See also ==
- Artists of the Tudor court
