= Susannah Hornebolt =

British artist (1503–c. 1554)

Susanna Hornebolt
- Born: 1503; Flanders
- Died: c. 1554 (aged 50–51); England
- Known for: Portrait miniature, illuminations
- Notable work: Illumination, The Savior
- Spouse(s): John Parker, John Gilman

Susanna(h) A Hornebolt or Horenbout (Note: Other alternate spellings include Hornebaud, Horenbout, Hoorenbault, and Horebout. The family name was anglicized in 1534 in a patent of denization as Hornebolt.) (1503–c. 1554) was the first known female artist in England and the Tudor dynasty. The daughter of Flemish artist Gerard Hornebolt and sister of Lucas Horenbout, Susannah learned to paint with her father. She gained recognition in Europe in 1521 when Albrecht Dürer bought her illumination, The Savior.

She came to England from Ghent, as did Lucas, her father, and mother, Margaret Svanders Hornebolt. (The family name was anglicised to Hornebolt in 1534). She was a gentlewoman of the Privy Chamber for Jane Seymour, Anne of Cleves, Catherine Parr, and perhaps Queen Mary. She was reputedly an artist for Henry VIII and his court. Hornebolt married John Parker and after his death married John Gilman.

Her work has been admired by contemporary artists Albrecht Dürer, Guicciardini and Vasari.

== Biography ==
=== Early life and art in Ghent ===
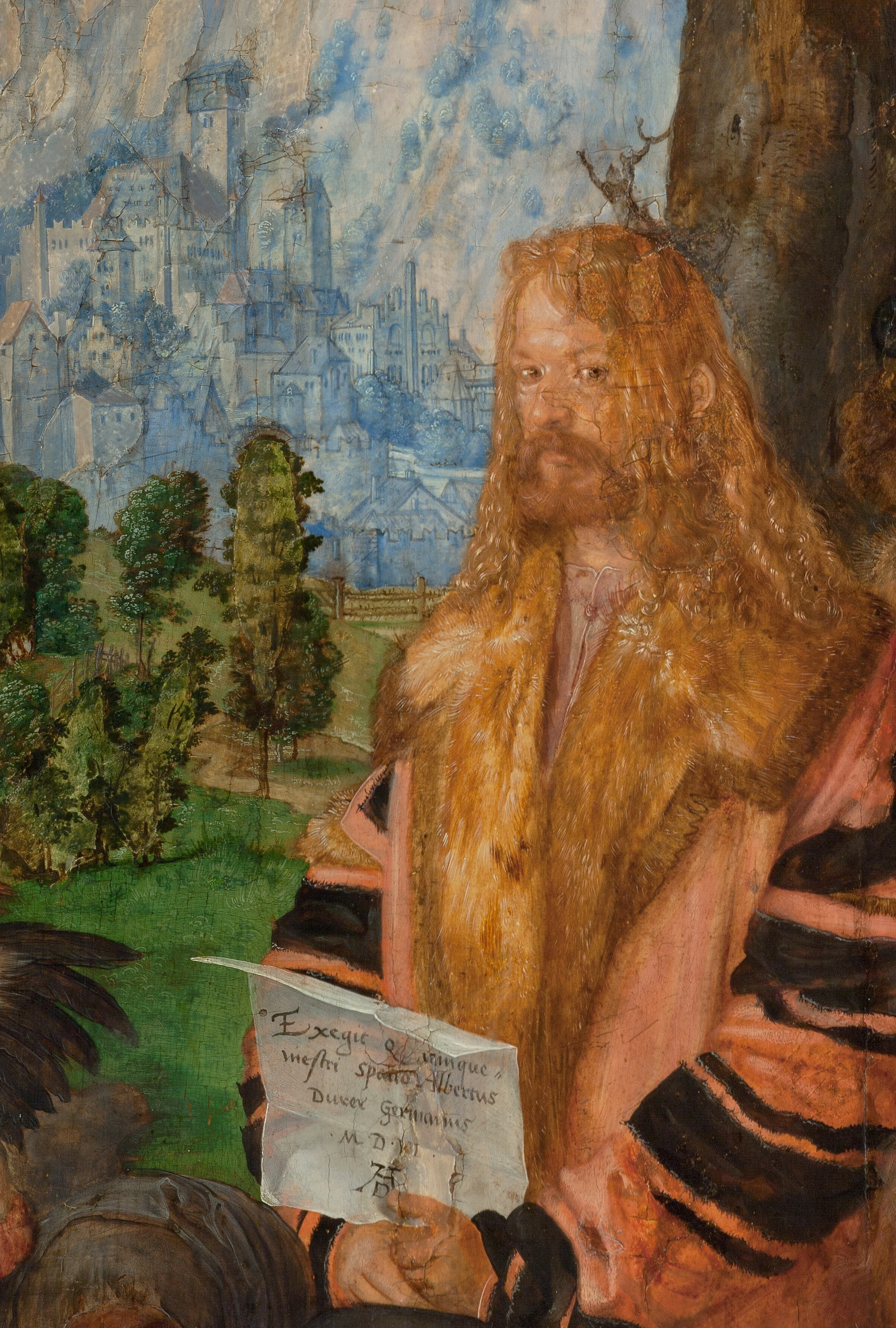
Albrecht Dürer, self-portrait, 1506. Dürer bought Hornebolt's illumination of The Savior in 1521.

Hornebolt was an illuminator, and daughter of Gerard Hornebolt and Margaret Svanders, who was the daughter of Derick Svanders and widow of Jan van Heerweghe. Susanna Horenbolt was related to Lucas Horenbout. (Note: She may have been sister to a Gerard and either the daughter or sister of Lucas. Gerard called her his sister when praising her work; It is likely, based upon the periods of time that they worked for Henry VIII, that Lucas and Gerard are cousins or brothers.) She started working for her father starting in 1520, and by 1521 she was known as a miniature painter and illuminator on the European continent. It was during that year that Albrecht Dürer bought an illumination that she had made of The Saviour when she was in Antwerp with her father. Guicciardini and Vasari "extol her excellence" as an illuminator. Guiccidardini wrote in 1567 that her "excellence in painting, particularly in the art of miniatures and illumination, was 'beyond believing'." In 1568 Vasari wrote that "she was one of a handful of Flemish women who had distinguished themselves by the excellence of their art."

The Hornebolt family, associated with the Ghent-Bruges school of manuscript illumination, was brought to England by Henry VIII to create portrait miniatures like the religious illuminations to "represent God's approval of the Tudors as England's ruling family."

=== Jane Seymour's household ===
She then came to England with her parents, Gerard and Margaret Hornebolt, in 1522 (allegedly, she is only confirmed in England in 1528) and was a gentlewoman attendant to Jane Seymour and an artist for Henry VIII's court. Jane Seymour died in 1537.

=== Marriage to Parker ===
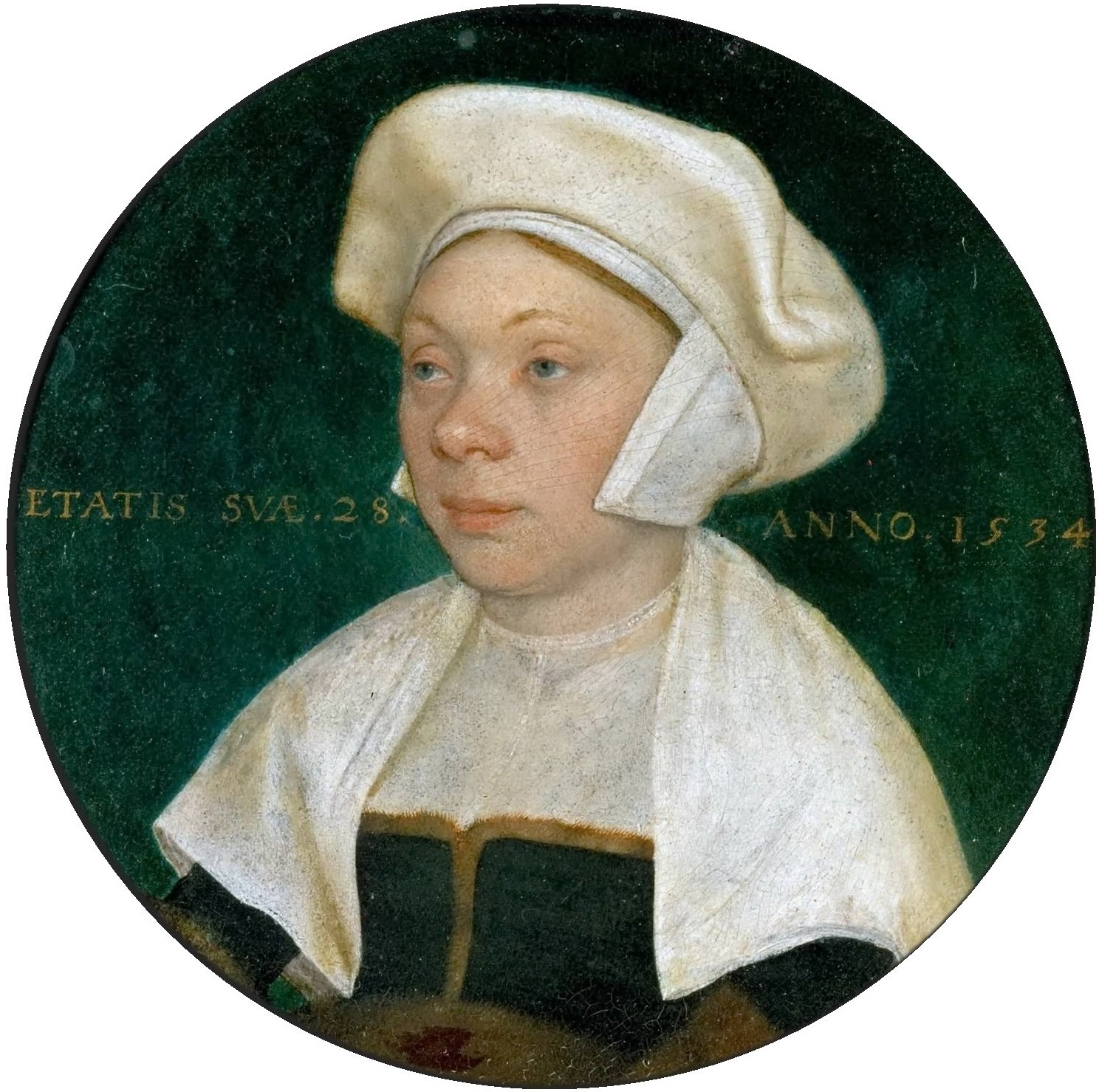
Portrait of a servant's wife by Hans Holbein the Younger. The sitter, a 28-year-old woman in 1534, was once believed to be Susannah, but she was probably around 31 in 1534.

Around 1525 or 1526 she was married to John Parker (c. 1493/4 September 1537), who was for Henry VIII a Keeper of the Palace of Westminster, Yeoman of the King's Crossbows, and later Yeoman of the King's Robes. He had houses at King's Langley in Hertfordshire and Fulham in London. Henry VIII gave the "gentlewoman of the court" and her husband a gilt cup with cover and gilt spoons for the 1532 and 1533 New Years. In 1534 miniature portraits were made of them by Hans Holbein the Younger, which may be titled A Court Official of King Henry VIII and his wife and held in Vienna's Kunsthistorisches Museum. They had no children. Parker died in 1537. With the loss of both Jane Seymour and her husband, she lost her means of support and by 1538 had "serious financial difficulties."

=== Marriage to Gilman and Queen's privy chamber ===
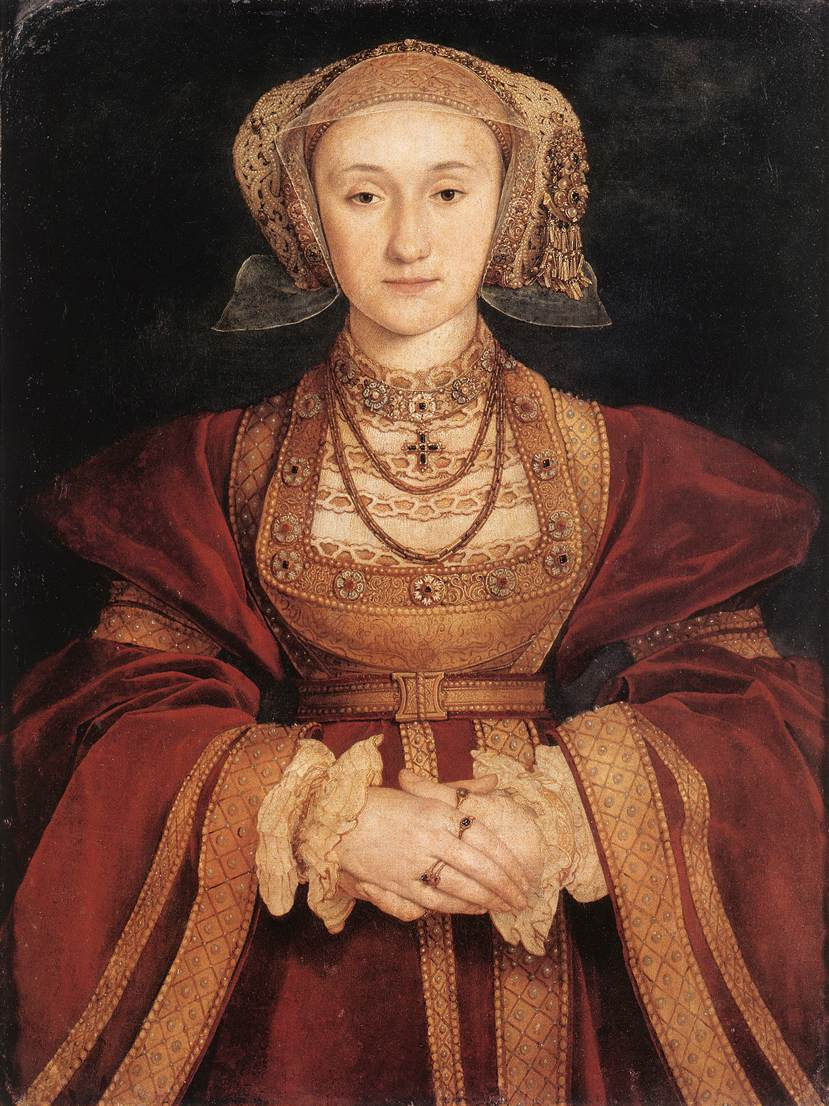
Hans Holbein the Younger, Betrothal portrait of Anne of Cleves, about 1539. It was Holbein who painted Hornebolt and husband John Parker's miniature portrait. Hornebolt was appointed a gentlewoman attendant in Anne of Cleve's household by Henry VIII.

She married widower John Gilman or Gylmyn (c. 1503–1558) on September 22, 1539, in Westminster at St. Margaret's Church. He had a daughter, was a vintner's company freeman, and was, or was to become, Serjeant of the King's Woodyard. She was the second of Gilman's three wives and gentlewoman attendant to Anne of Cleves.

Two weeks after her marriage to Gilman, she went to Cleves to escort Anne to England for her marriage on 6 January 1540 to Henry VIII. The king provided £40 so that Hornebolt could have a properly appointed wardrobe. She was poor at that time and did not have the proper clothes for the stately visit. The trip to Cleves was led by Nicholas Wotton, dean of Canterbury, and included Susanna's husband, John Gilman.

Hornebolt became a member of Queen Anne's privy chamber and was responsible for four servants. The queen considered her the "first of her gentlewomen."

The Gilmans lived in London, first in St. Bide's parish and then Richmond. They had two sons and two or more daughters. About 1540 she and her husband had their first child, a son named Henry Gilman (1540–1593); Henry VIII was the boy's godfather. Henry of Twicknam married Isabell West, daughter of Thomas West. Hornebolt also had a daughter named Anne (born about 1541 to 1542). Hornebolt served in the household of Catherine Parr until Edward VI's reign, which began in 1547. In June of that year Hornebolt and her husband brought a case to the Court of Requests against John Parker's heirs. She may have served under Queen Mary, from who she is noted to have received 2 yards of black satin.

She died in 1545 or in the 1550s: she was dead by 1554 when Gilman married for the third time. (Note: She is said to have died in Worcester and an account states that she was wife of a sculptor called Worsley or Whorstly. One Worsley is mentioned in the list of the royal household, and she may have married him after Parker's death, except that Hornebolte was the second of John Gilman's wives. After Susanna's death, Gilman married a woman named Ellen, who proved his will.)

=== Artist in England ===
According to James Lees-Milne, Hornebolt worked for the king as a "clever illuminator" and had competition from another woman, the daughter of manuscript illuminator Simon Bening, Levina Teerlinc of Bruges, (Note: Teerlinc received a salary from King Edward and was appreciated by Queen Elizabeth.) who was 10 or more years younger than Hornebolt. J.D. Mackie, author of The Earlier Tudors, 1485-1558 submits that portraits and miniatures of the king were likely made by Gerard, Lucas, and Susannah. (Note: Kathy Lee Emerson, author of Wives and Daughters: The Women of Sixteenth Century England contends that Hornebolt only had a reputation as a working artist on the European continent.) "This Susanna Hornbaud is stated to have practised painting in miniature in England and with greatest success, being much patronised by Henry the Eighth and all the Court," said The Society of Antiquaries of London. She was described by authors Lorne Campbell and Susan Foister as "an excellent painter and illuminator, who had found the highest favour at the court of Henry VIII in England. Catherine Parr was said to have employed three women miniature painters and these were Susannah Hornebolt, Levina Teerlinc and Margaret Holsewyther.

== In historical fiction ==
Susanna Horenbout and John Parker are the protagonists in a series of historical fiction novels by Michelle Diener, first published in 2011. Horenbout is portrayed as a "one part skilled painter and two parts damsel in distress", later developing into "a more active heroine".
