= Pieter van Coninxloo =

Early Netherlandish painter (c. 1460–1513)

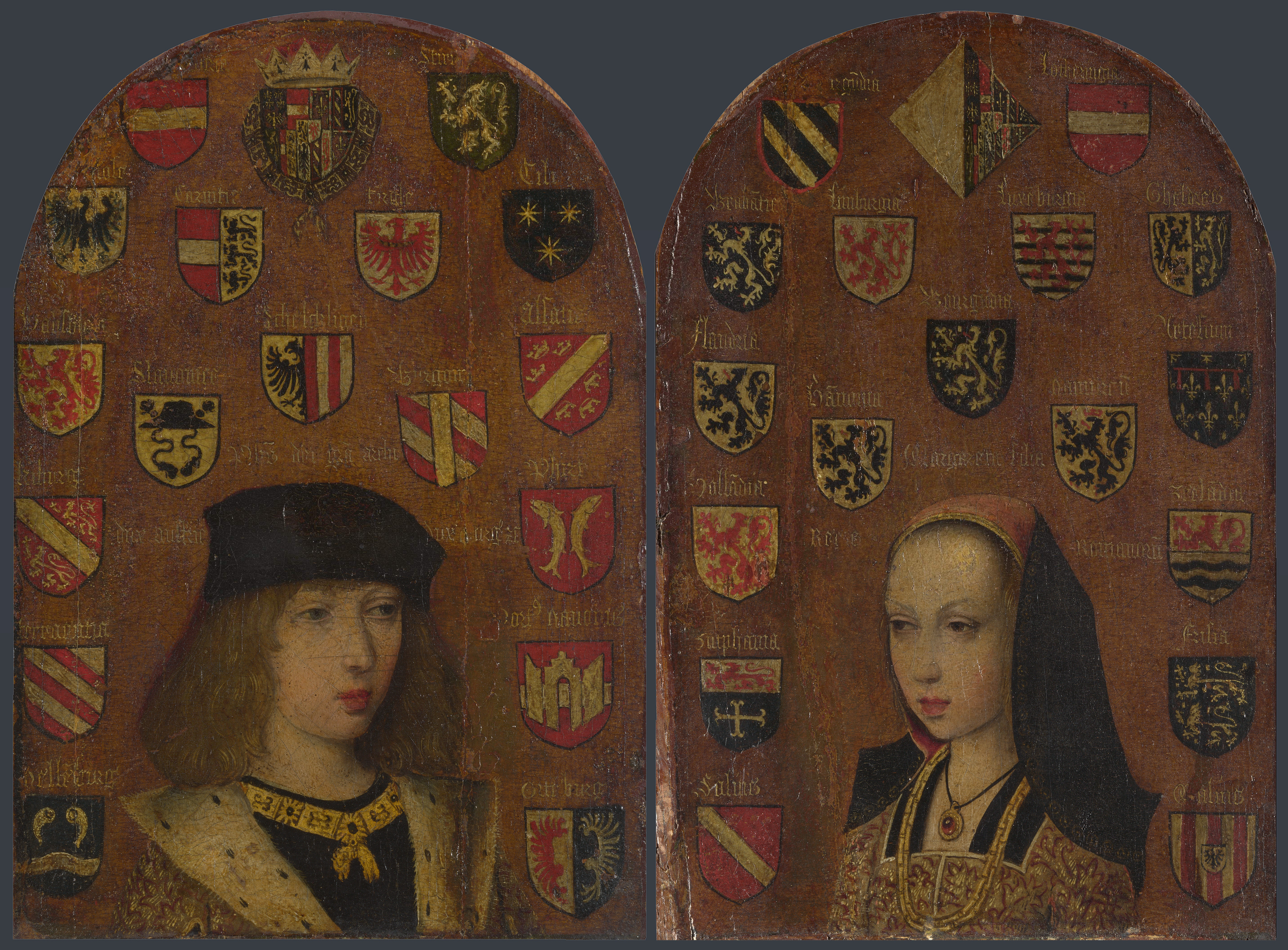
Philip the Handsome and Margaret of Austria, c. 1493-5. Diptych, Oil on oak panels, each 23.8cm x 16.5cm. National Gallery, London.

Pieter van Coninxloo (c. 1460–1513) was an Early Netherlandish painter first documented as active in Brussels from 1479. Little is known of his life apart from his appearance in records of 1479, 1503 and 1513, in the archives of Margaret of Austria when he is mentioned in relation to the commission of portraits. He came from a family of artists; at least six generations were painters. His brother was Jan van Coninxloo.

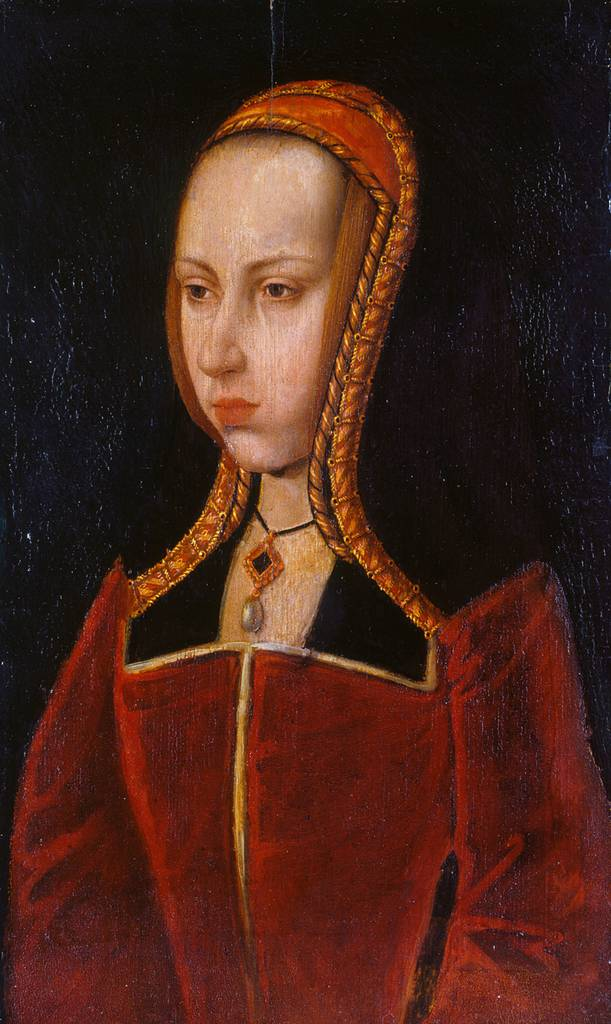
Portrait of Margaret of Austria, usually dated c. 1505, however it may date from as early as 1493. Oil on panel, 36.7cm x 22.5cm. Royal Collection

Van Coninxloo specialised in portraiture, and worked at different times for the Burgundian court. In 1505, he was paid for a portrait of Margaret of Austria commissioned by Philip the Good with the intention of sending it to Henry VII of England. It is presumed this is the one now in the Royal Collection. He was employed in 1513 to paint portraits of the future Charles V and his sisters. Max Friedländer believes he may have been one of the most significant of the Brussels school painters before Bernard van Orley. However, only a handful of his works have survived, and even these are tentatively attributed.

He is sometimes associated with the unidentified artist known as the Master of the Legend of the Magdalen (Meister der Magdalenenlegende), thought to have been a court painter to Margaret of Austria, and who shares similarities of style, time and location. A number of art historians, including Max Friedländer, who first identified the Master of the Legend of the Magdalen, speculated that they may have been the same person. He may also have been a member of the master's workshop.

== Sources ==
- Campbell, Lorne. The Fifteenth Century Netherlandish Schools. London: National Gallery Publications, 1998. ISBN 1-85709-171-X
