= Margaret of Austria, Duchess of Savoy =

Governor of the Habsburg Netherlands from 1507 to 1530

Margaret of Austria
- Princess of Asturias
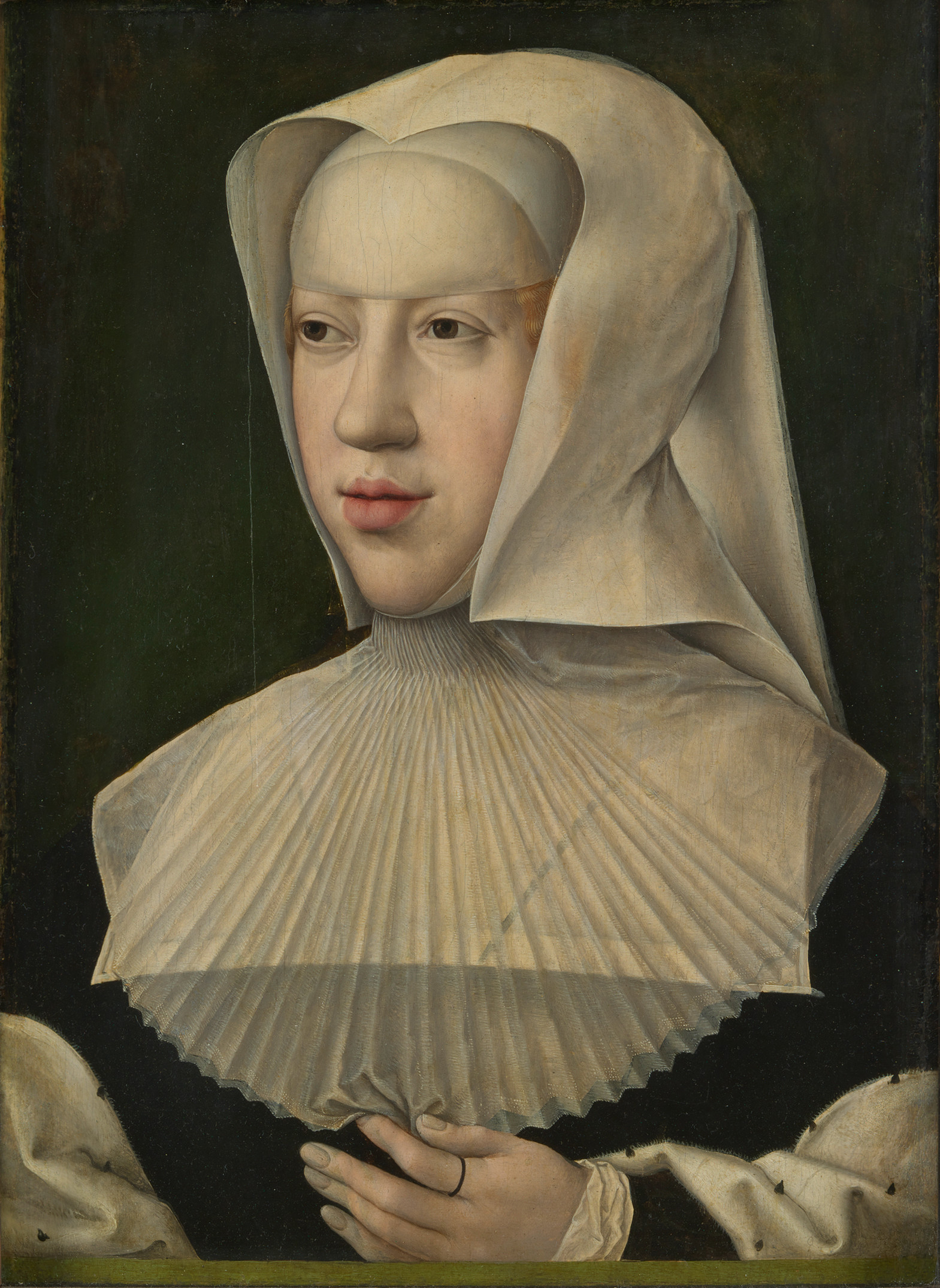
- Margaret as a widow, by Bernard van Orley c.1510

Duchess consort of Savoy
- Tenure: 2 December 1501 – 10 September 1504

Governor of the Habsburg Netherlands
- In office: 1507–1530
- Predecessor: William de Croÿ
- Successor: Mary of Austria
- Born: 10 January 1480; Brussels
- Died: 1 December 1530 (aged 50); Mechelen, Duchy of Brabant, Holy Roman Empire
- Spouses: John, Prince of Asturias (m. 1497; died 1497) Philibert II, Duke of Savoy (m. 1501; died 1504)
- House: Habsburg
- Father: Maximilian I, Holy Roman Emperor
- Mother: Mary, Duchess of Burgundy
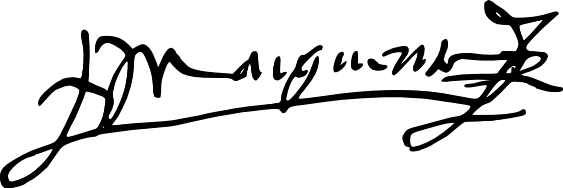
- Signature

Margaret of Austria (German: Margarete; French: Marguerite; Dutch: Margaretha; Spanish: Margarita; 10 January 1480 – 1 December 1530) was Governor of the Habsburg Netherlands from 1507 to 1515 and again from 1519 until her death in 1530. She was the first of many female regents in the Netherlands. She was variously the Princess of Asturias, Duchess of Savoy, and was born an Archduchess of Austria.

Her life until her mid-twenties was dominated by her importance in political marriages, and the early death of many of her close family. She was engaged for three marriage alliances, and completed two, but both husbands died within a few years: six months in 1497 in the case of John, Prince of Asturias, and three years with Philibert II, Duke of Savoy, from 1501. Her mother had died when she was two, and her only brother in 1506.

Thereafter she made a success, according to most historians, of the highly important role of regent or governor of the Habsburg Netherlands, for firstly her father Maximilian I, Holy Roman Emperor, then her nephew Charles V, who were both forced to spend most of their time in Germany and other parts of the growing Habsburg empire.

She spent most of her life in the Netherlands. Her usual name comes from being a member of the Austrian Habsburg family; she hardly went there, and probably neither spoke nor read German, unlike French and Castilian. The German texts in her extensive library were in French translations.

== Childhood and life in France ==
Margaret was born on 10 January 1480 in Brussels and baptised in what is now the cathedral there, named after her step-grandmother, Margaret of York. She was the second child and only daughter of Maximilian of Austria (future Holy Roman Emperor) and Mary of Burgundy, co-sovereigns of the Low Countries. In 1482, her mother died and her four-year-old brother Philip the Handsome succeeded her as sovereign of the Low Countries, with her father as his regent.

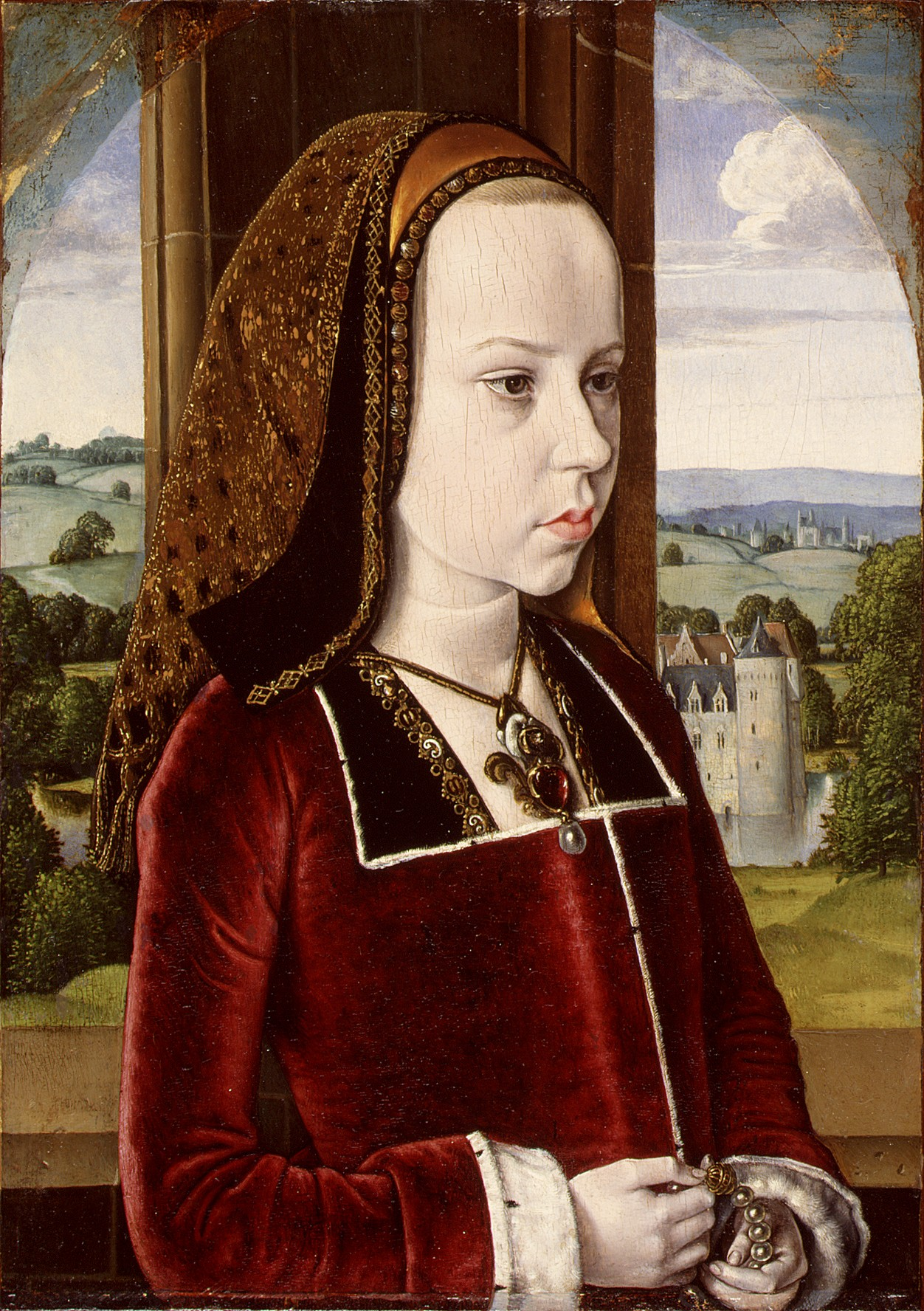
Portrait of Margaret at about ten by Jean Hey, c. 1490

The same year her mother died, King Louis XI of France signed the Treaty of Arras, whereby her father promised to give her hand in marriage to Louis's son, the Dauphin Charles. The engagement took place in 1483, and on the death of his father he became Charles VIII of France later in the year, at the age of 13. With Franche-Comté and Artois as her dowry, Margaret was transferred to the guardianship of Louis XI, until he died in August. She was to be raised as a fille de France and prepared for her future role as Queen of France in the household of the Queen Mother Charlotte of Savoy, mostly at the Château d'Amboise; but Queen Charlotte also died in December 1483.

Now under the supervision of Charles's sister, Anne de Beaujeu, regent of France, and her governess Madame de Segré, Margaret received a fine education alongside several noble children, amongst whom was Louise of Savoy, four years older, who was later to become her sister-in-law.

Although their union was political, the young Margaret developed a genuine affection for Charles. However, he renounced the treaty in the autumn of 1491 and forcibly married Margaret's former stepmother Anne, Duchess of Brittany, for political reasons. The French court had ceased treating Margaret as their future queen but she could not return to her ex-stepmother's (Anne of Brittany) court until June 1493 after the Treaty of Senlis had been signed in May that year. She was hurt by Charles's actions and was left with a feeling of enduring resentment towards the House of Valois, even after Charles's death in 1498.

When she met her father in Maastricht as a young teenager, she had not seen him since she left for France at the age of two, but the two got on well, unlike his difficult relationship with her brother Philip.

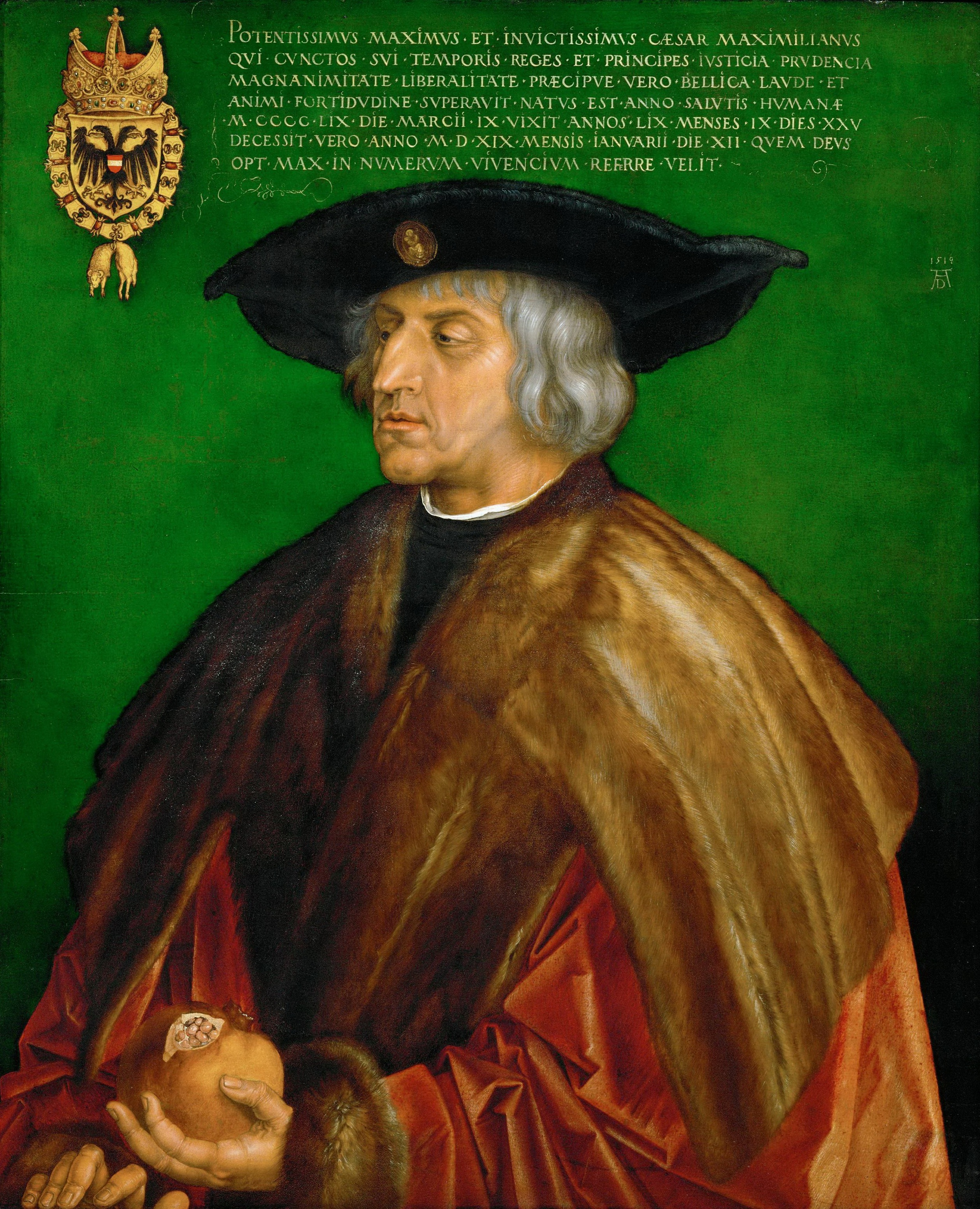
Her father, Emperor Maximilian I, 1519, Albrecht Dürer

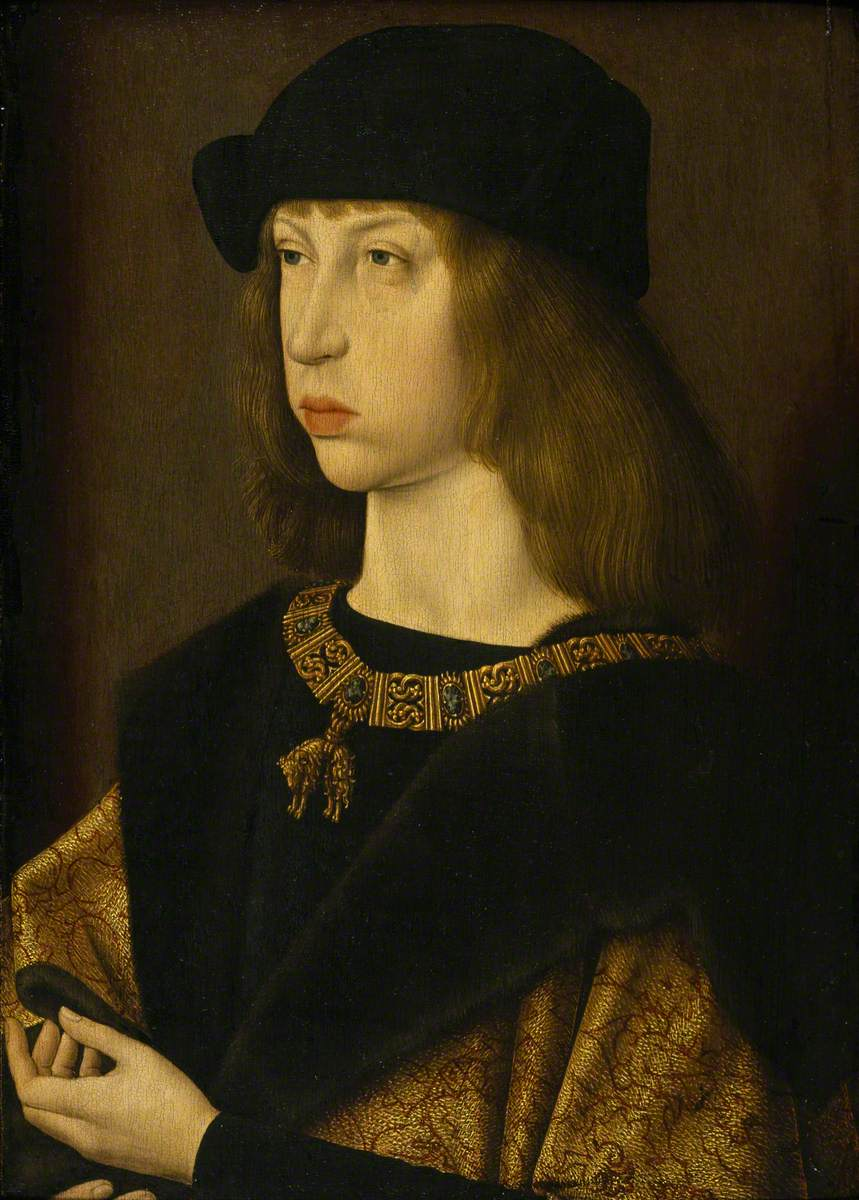
Her brother, Philip the Handsome, c. 1495

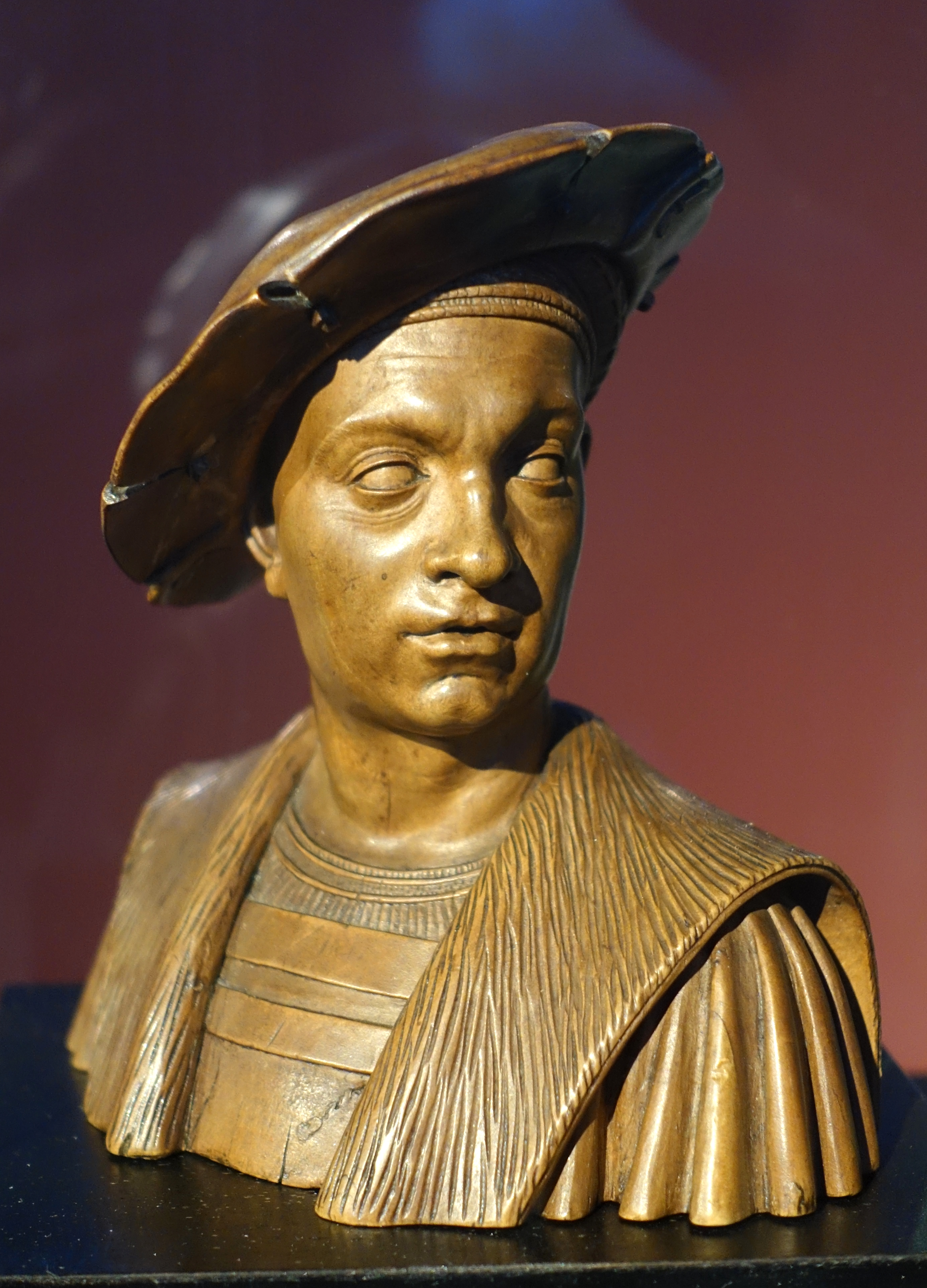
Her beloved 2nd husband, Philibert II, Duke of Savoy, by Conrat Meit

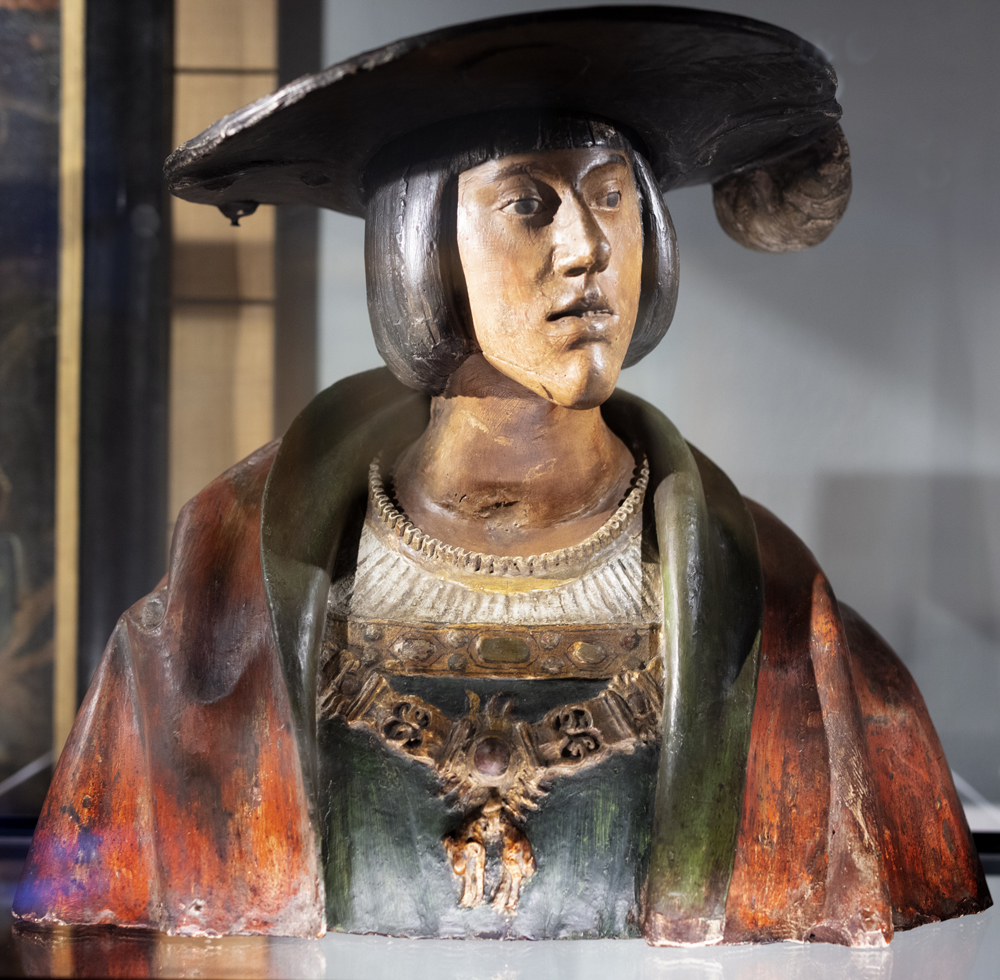
Bust of Margaret's nephew, Charles V, 1515–19, attributed to Conrat Meit

== Marriages ==
=== Princess of Asturias ===
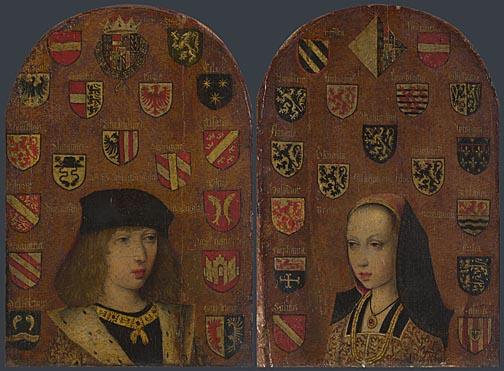
Pieter van Coninxloo, Philip the Handsome and Margaret of Austria, c. 1493–1495. Diptych, National Gallery

To achieve an alliance with Queen Isabella I of Castile and King Ferdinand II of Aragon, Maximilian started negotiating the marriage of their only son and heir, John, Prince of Asturias, to Margaret, as well as the marriage of their daughter Juana to Philip. Margaret left the Netherlands for Spain late in 1496. Her engagement to the Prince of Asturias seemed doomed when the ship carrying her to Spain hit a storm in the Bay of Biscay. In haste, she wrote her own epitaph should she not reach Spain:

"Here lies Margaret, the willing bride,
Twice married – but a virgin when she died."

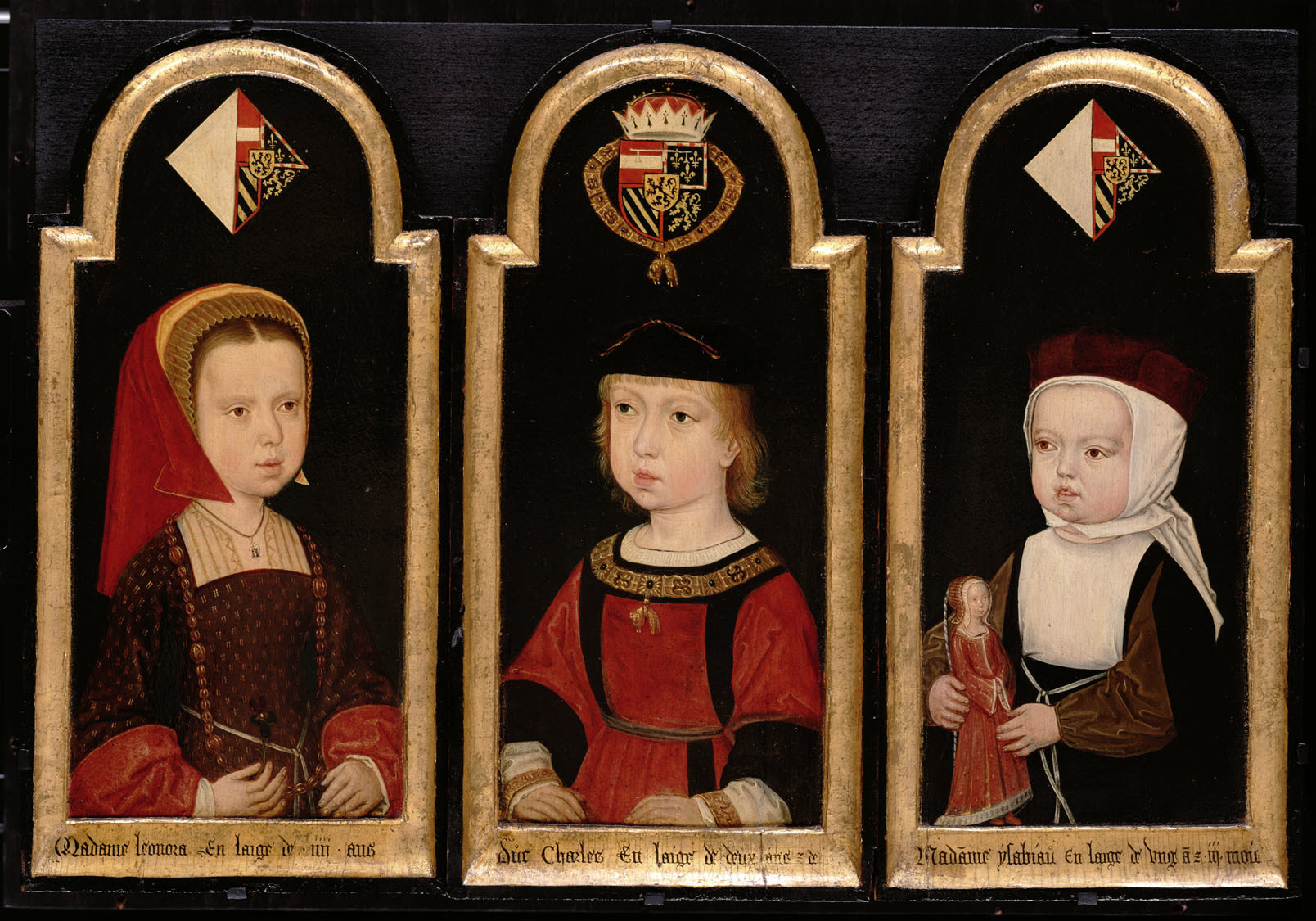
Charles V, aged two, between his sisters Eleanor and Isabella in 1502, a few years before Margaret, their aunt, took over their upbringing

She had had a proxy marriage back in Mechelen, including symbolically lying on a bed next to Francisco de Rojas y Escobar, acting as Spanish ambassador. However, Margaret survived the storm, and in February 1497 her entire fleet was still waiting in Southampton in England for the weather to clear up. Margaret actually married Prince John on 3 April 1497 in Burgos Cathedral. Tragically, John died of a fever after only six months, on 4 October. Margaret was left pregnant but gave birth to a premature stillborn daughter on 2 April 1498. Margaret stayed in Spain until September 1499 before returning home. In the meantime it was suggested that she should teach her teenage sister-in-law Catherine of Aragon French.

When she was on her way back, her nephew, the future Emperor Charles V was born. Her brother, Philip, sent an express messenger to his sister, "begging her to hasten back so that she could hold the child in her hands at the font during the baptism." When she arrived, she pressured Philip to name the baby Maximilian, after their father, but Philip chose to name him Charles, after their maternal grandfather Charles the Bold. She was Charles's godmother, and was later to play the main part in raising him after his father's early death.

By this time, the unexpected deaths of Isabella of Aragon, Queen of Portugal, elder sister of John, Prince of Asturias, in 1498, and her infant son Miguel in 1500, left Joanna and eventually Charles the heirs to the thrones of Castille and Aragon, while he also inherited the Netherlands and the Habsburg claim to the Holy Roman Empire.

=== Duchess of Savoy ===
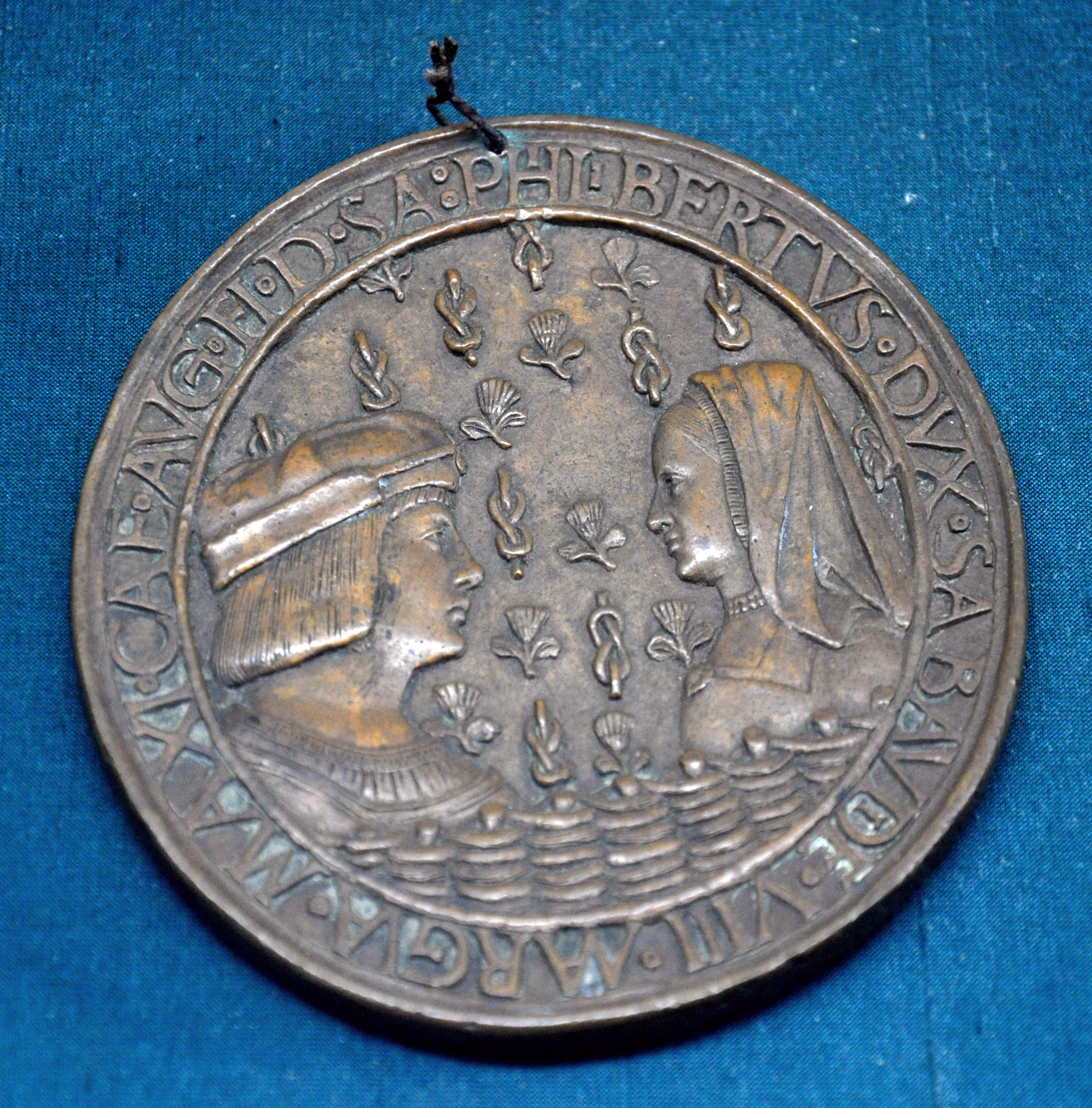
Medal of Philibert and Margaret, Jean Marende

In 1501, Margaret married Philibert II, Duke of Savoy (1480–1504), whose realm played a decisive role in the rivalry between France and the Habsburgs in Italy on account of its strategic position in the Western Alps. Though the same age as Margaret, this was his second marriage. They had a very stable relationship for those 3 years, mostly living not in Savoy proper, but in Bresse, then Savoyard territory on the eastern borders of Burgundy (today in France).

When Margaret came to Savoy, the government was in the hands of René, Philibert's bastard brother. Margaret fought hard to strip away his powers and possessions, even involving Maximilian (as Holy Roman Emperor, he was overlord of Savoy) to nullify the letters that gave René legitimacy. René, being declared a traitor, took refuge in France and was welcomed by his half-sister Louise of Savoy, mother of Francis I. Margaret then took hold of the government, while her husband focused on private hobbies like hunting (which she did share with him). She summoned councils, appointed officers, and when her brother Philip visited, she discussed and approved his plan regarding a continued rapprochement with France.

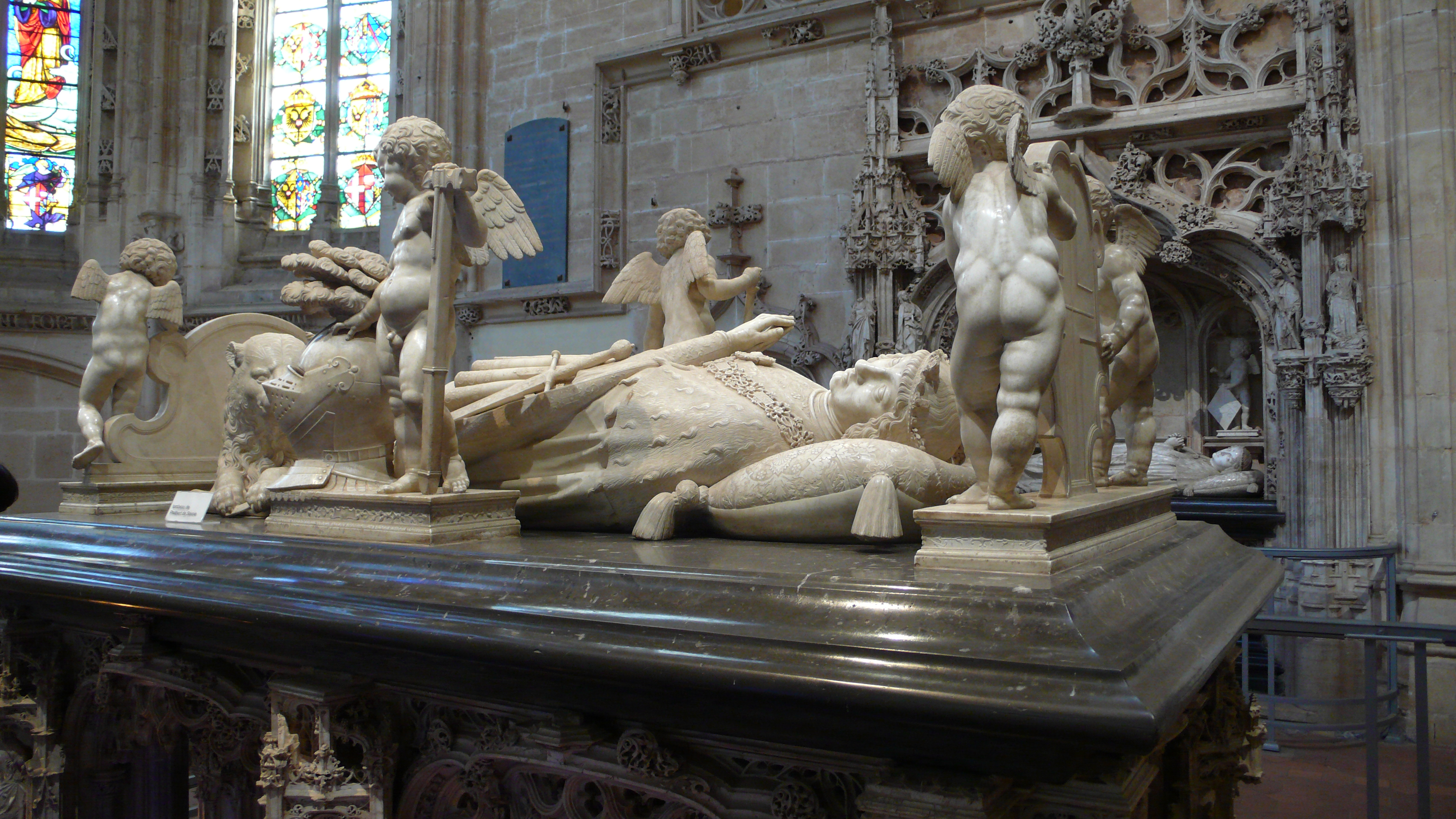
Philibert's tomb in the Monastery of Brou (Bourg-en-Bresse, Ain, France)

In September 1504 Philibert died of pleurisy. Grief-stricken, Margaret threw herself out of a window, but was saved. After being persuaded to bury her husband, she had his heart embalmed so she could keep it with her forever. Her court historian and poet Jean Lemaire de Belges gave her the title "Dame de deuil" (Lady of Mourning). She remained in Savoy for two years as a widow, beginning the lengthy construction of the lavishly designed Royal Monastery of Brou in Bresse (now eastern France) to house the tombs of Philibert, his mother Margaret of Bourbon (1438–1483) and eventually herself. She returned to the Netherlands after the sudden death of her brother Philip the Handsome in September 1506, at her father's request.

In 1505 Maximilian and Philip had tried to arrange a match with Henry VII of England, 48 years old at the time, but Margaret refused. A portrait, probably five years old, was sent to England.

== Governor of the Habsburg Netherlands ==
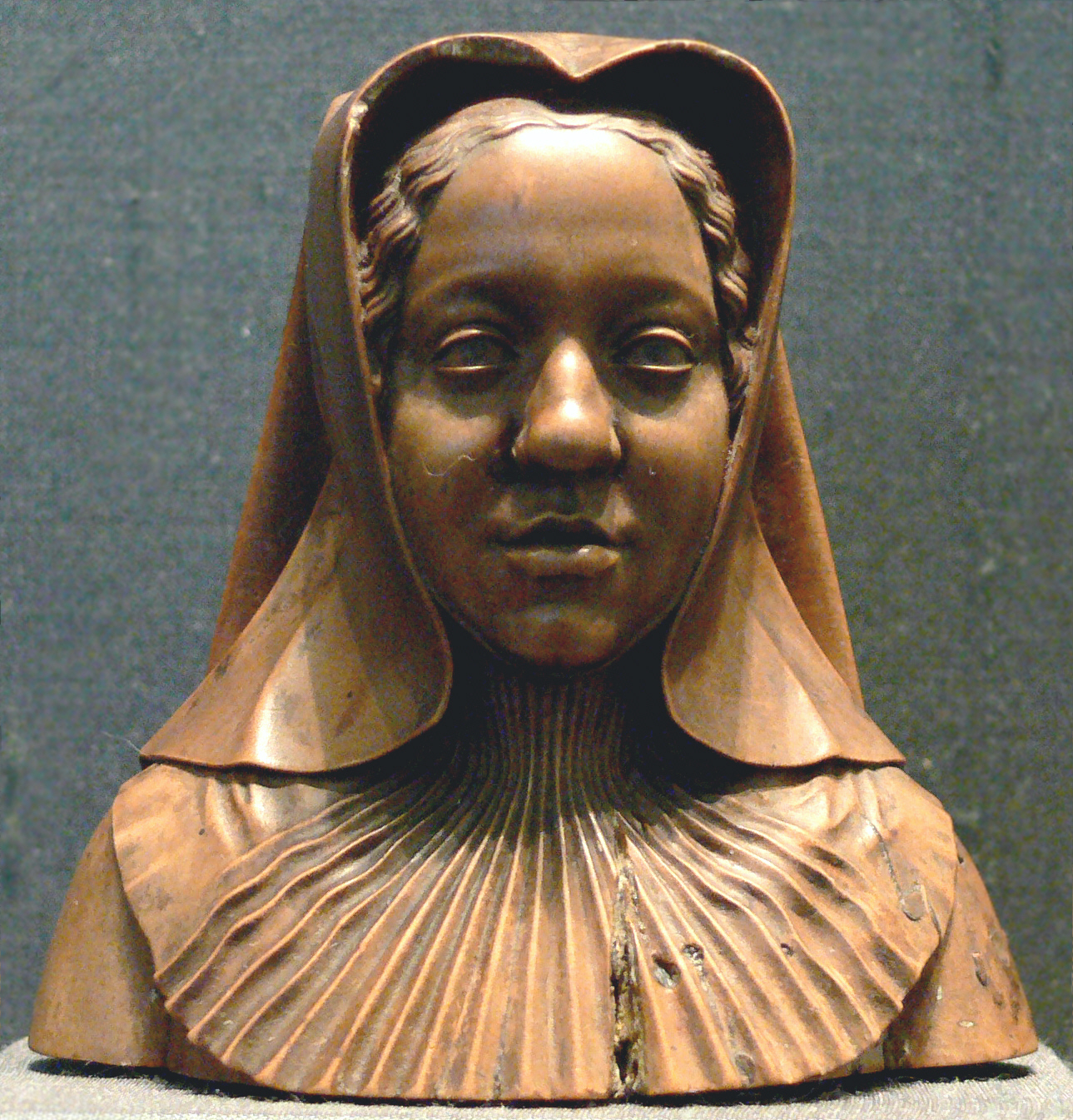
Margaret of Austria, pearwood, by Conrat Meit, c. 1518

Queen Isabella died in late 1504, and Philip and Juana went to Castile to claim the crown. After Philip's death, Charles was the new sovereign of the Low Countries, but he was only six years old, and his mother Juana could not act as regent because her unstable mental state. Her Castilian subjects would also not allow their ruler to live outside the kingdom. Preoccupied with German affairs, her father, Emperor Maximilian I, named Margaret governor of the Low Countries and guardian of Charles in 1507, along with her nieces Eleanor, Isabella and Mary (then all children, who would later marry foreign monarchs). Only her nephew Ferdinand I, Holy Roman Emperor (as he became some fifty years later), was brought up in Spain in the charge of his grandfather Ferdinand II of Aragon, and when adult was sent to govern Austria. Margaret became the only woman elected as its ruler by the representative assembly of Franche-Comté, with her title confirmed in 1509.

Some report that Margaret was considered a foreigner because of her childhood at the French court. According to Blockmans and others though, Margaret, Philip as well as Charles V were considered indigenous; only Maximilian was always a foreigner. The Governess served as an intermediary between her father and her nephew's subjects in the Netherlands from her newly built palace at Mechelen. During a remarkably successful career, she broke new ground for women rulers.

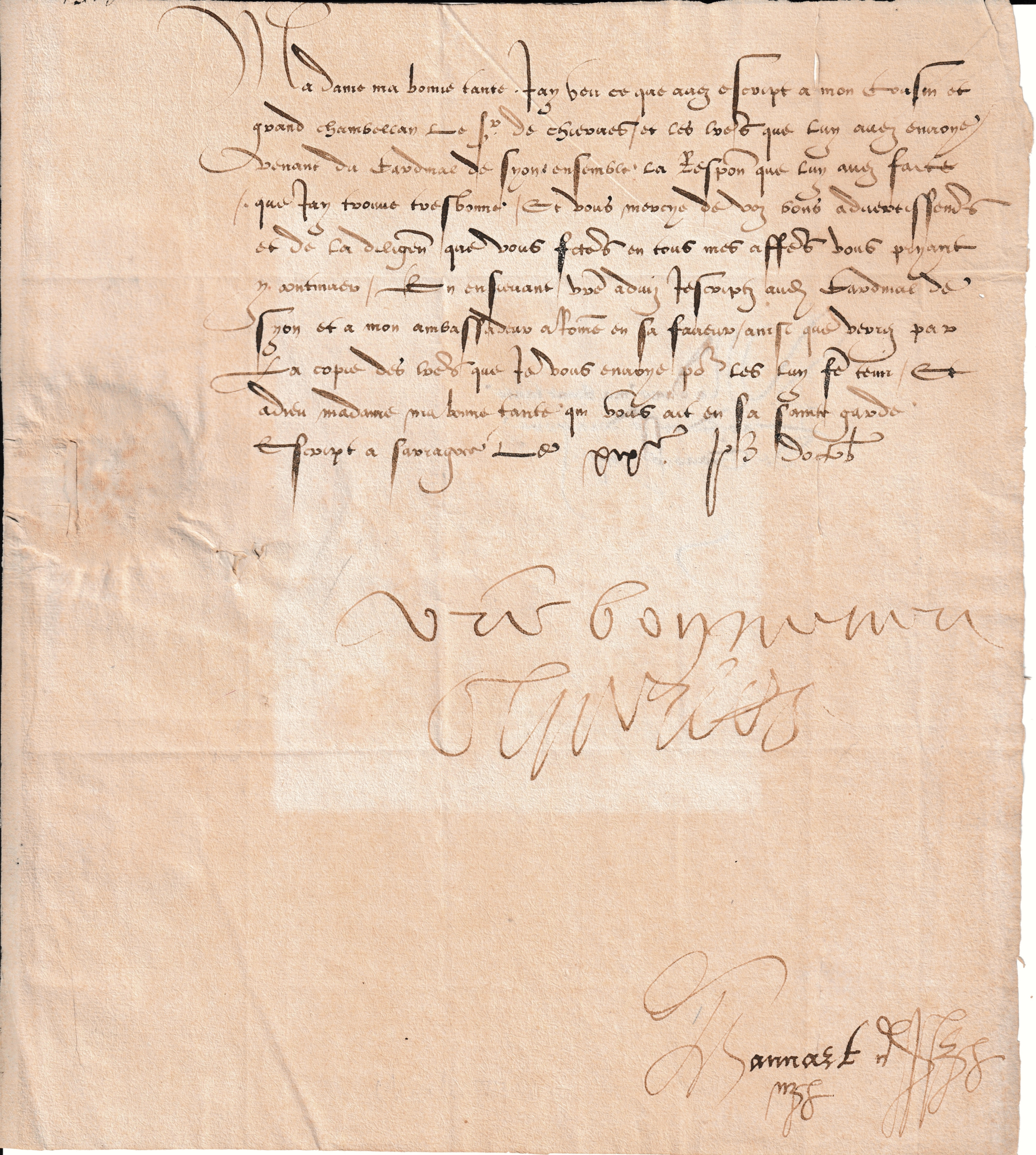
A letter by Charles V to his aunt, Margaret of Austria, 19 October 1518, after she had returned to her previous position as his governess for the Netherlands, ending "Et adieu madame ma bonne tante que vous ait en sa saincte garde. Escript a Saragosse le XIX jour d'octobre".

In 1520, Charles made Margaret his governor-general in gratitude for her services. She was the only regent he ever re-appointed indefinitely from 1519 until her death in on 1 December 1530.

Tupu Ylä-Anttila opines that Margaret acted as de facto queen consort in a political sense, first to her father and then Charles V, "absent rulers" who needed a representative dynastic presence that also complemented their characteristics. Her queenly virtues helped her to play the role of diplomat and peace-maker, as well as guardian and educator of future rulers, whom Maximilian called "our children" or "our common children" in letters to Margaret. This was a model that developed as part of the solution for the emerging Habsburg composite monarchy and would continue to serve later generations. As an older relative and former guardian, she had more power with Charles than with her father Maximilian, who treated her cordially but occasionally acted in a threatening manner.

The authors of The Promised Lands: The Low Countries Under Burgundian Rule, 1369–1530 credit Margaret with keeping the provinces together as well as fulfilling the demands for peace from the Netherlandish Estates. Despite Louis XII's attempts to regain control of certain territories and to interfere in Guelders, Friesland and Liege, cooperation between the regent, the Privy Council and the Estates General maintained the integrity of the Burgundian inheritance.

=== Foreign policy ===
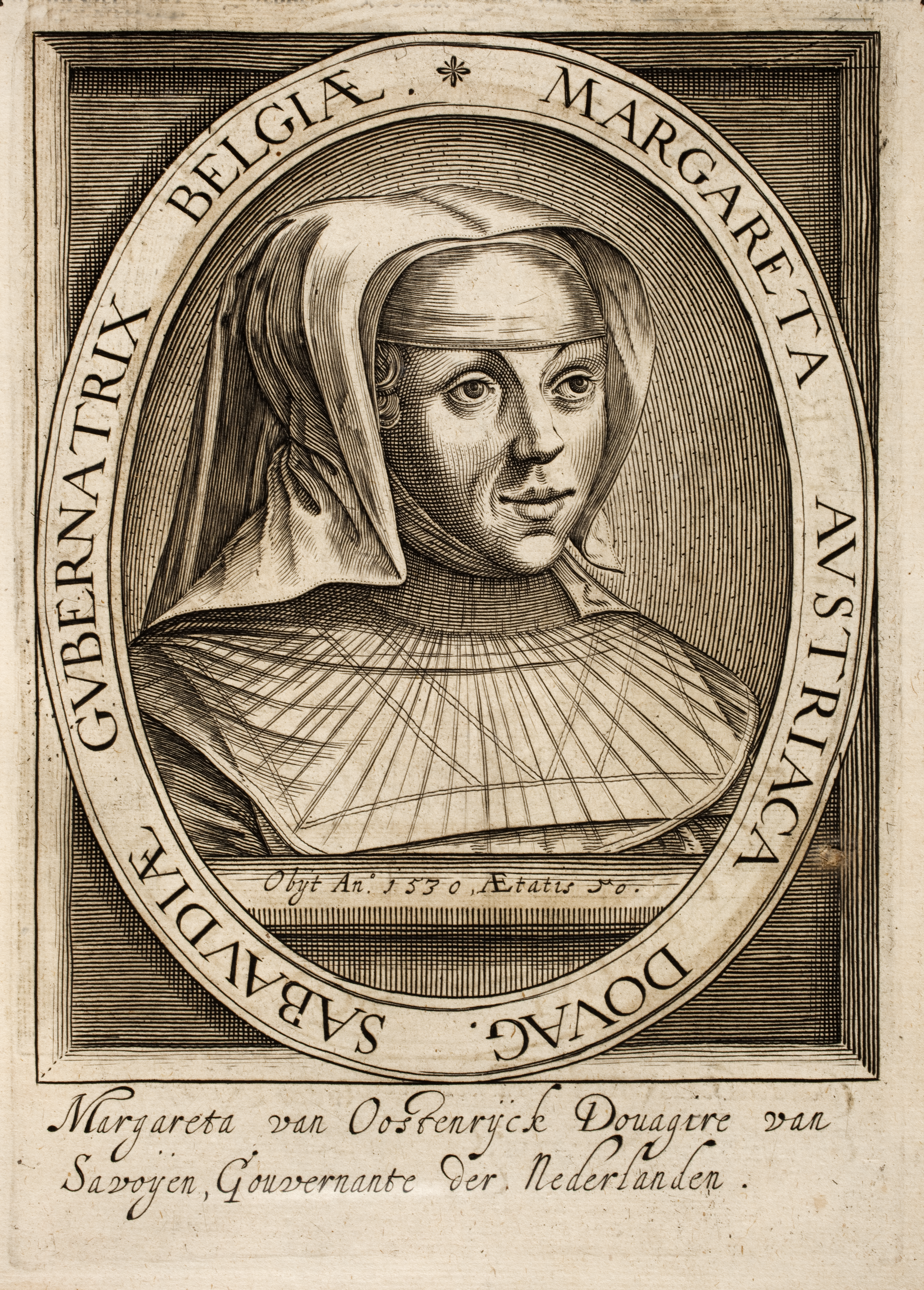
Later engraving

Margaret soon found herself at war with France over the question of Charles's requirement to pay homage to the French king for the County of Flanders (which was outside the Empire; and while a long-standing portion of the inherited Burgundian titles & provinces, legally still within France). In response, she persuaded Emperor Maximilian to end the war with King Louis XII. On November 1508, she journeyed to Cambrai to assist in the formation of the League of Cambrai, which ended (for a time) the possibility of a French invasion of the Low Countries, redirecting French attention to Northern Italy.

The Estates preferred to maintain peace with France and Guelders. But Charles of Egmont, the de facto lord of Guelders, continued to cause trouble. In 1511, she made an alliance with England and besieged Venlo, but Charles of Egmont invaded Holland so the siege had to be lifted. When she asked her father (who had fought Guelders even without the Low Countries's help during the time of Philip, and then helped Philip to achieve his 1505 victory over Guelders) to come to help, he suggested to her that the Estates in the Low Countries should defend themselves, forcing her to sign the 1513 treaty with Charles, recognizing him as Duke of Guelders and Count of Zutphen. In 1514, he marched into Arnhem – a clear breach of the treaty. The Habsburg Netherlands would only be able to incorporate Guelders and Zutphen under Charles V.

According to James D. Tracy, Maximilian and Margaret were reasonable in demanding more stern measures against Guelders, but their critics in the Estates General (that had continuously voted against providing funds for wars against Guelders) and among the nobles naively thought that Charles of Egmont could be controlled by maintaining the peaceful relationship with the King of France, his patron. After Charles's brief personal rule (1514–1517), Margaret returned to witness Guelders's most stunning military success in decades, together with a horrible trail of destruction their Black Band mercenaries left through Friesland and Holland. Many of Charles V's Netherlands subjects, including leading Humanists like Erasmus and Hadrianus Barlandus unreasonably mistrusted their government, suspecting that princes (Maximilian, in particular) were concocting clever schemes just to expand the Habsburg dominion and extracting money (in fact, Maximilian also did hope to employ the wealth of the Low Countries to finance his projects elsewhere – he hardly succeeded though). The inaction of the experienced commander Rudolf von Anhalt during the sacking of the town of Tienen in Brabant, in particular, made Barlandus suspect a sinister motive (in reality, von Anhalt was ordered by Margaret to avoid direct engagement until he had more troops).

By 1512, she told her father that the Netherlands existed on peace and trade, and thus she would declare neutrality while using foreign armies and funds to wage wars. She played the key role in bringing together the participants of Holy League: the pope, the Swiss, Henry VIII, Ferdinand II of Aragon and her father Maximilian (he joined the League only as Emperor, as not as guardian of his grandson Charles and thus, the Low Countries' neutrality was maintained). The league targeted France. The treaty also would not prevent the more adventurous Netherlands seigneurs from serving under Maximilian and Henry when they attacked the French later.

Following this strategy, in 1513, at the head of Henry VIII's army, Maximilian gained a victory against the French at the Battle of the Spurs, at little cost to himself or his daughter (in fact according to Margaret, the Low Countries got a profit of one million of gold from supplying the English army). For the sake of his grandson Charles's Burgundian lands, he ordered Thérouanne's walls to be demolished (the stronghold had often served as a backdoor for French interference in the Low Countries).

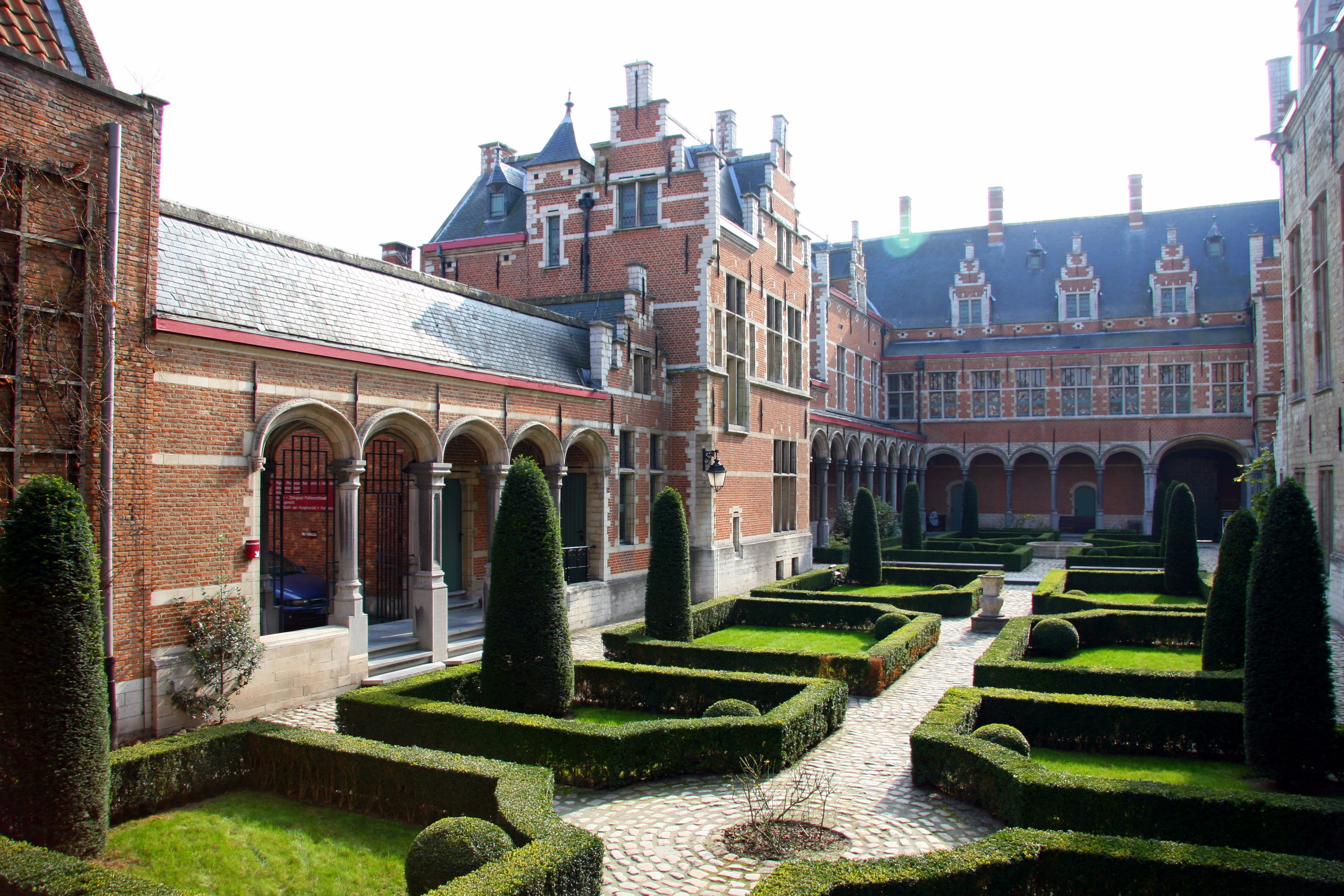
Inner courtyard of Margaret of Austria's Palace in Mechelen, Belgium. It was one of the first Renaissance buildings in northern Europe.

After Maximillian I's death in 1519, Margaret and young Charles (then 18) began to negotiate the latter's election as Holy Roman Emperor despite the opposition of the papacy and France. The Governess instead supported her younger nephew Archduke Ferdinand. However, Charles refused to withdraw. Using a combination of diplomacy and bribery, Margaret played a crucial role in the election of Charles as Holy Roman Emperor in 1519, defeating the candidacy of King Francis I of France, who from this day forward became Charles' great rival in the struggle for pre-eminence in Europe.

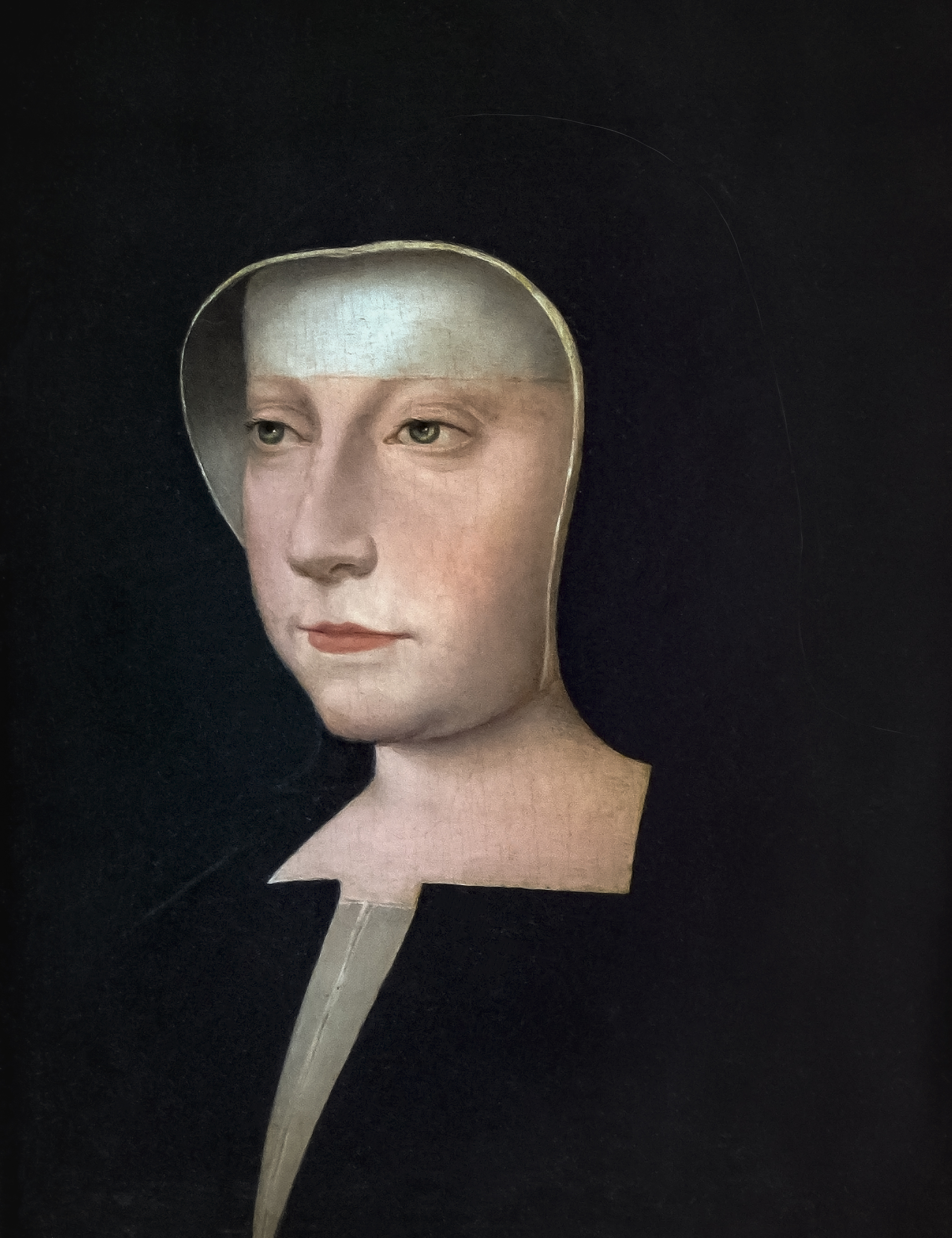
Louise of Savoy, with whom Margaret negotiated the terms of the Treaty of Cambrai.

As Emperor, Charles V inherited the long-running disputes with the Kings of France over possession of the Duchy of Milan and the Kingdom of Naples. Though Charles preferred the Netherlands to many of his possessions, his many kingdoms (and many wars) required him to travel throughout Europe. His great victory at Pavia over Francis I in 1525 in which he took the French King prisoner and then freed him in exchange for his sons as hostages, led once more to French invasion of the Low Countries. Francis reneged on promises to renounce overlordship of Artois, Flanders and the Franche-Cômté, much less return the much-desired Burgundian core territory, the Duchy itself centered at Dijon, as soon as he was safely back in France.

Once again, Margaret proved a remarkably capable ruler of the Netherlands, holding off the forces of the League of Cognac – i.e. the French (1526–29) and then negotiating the "Paix de Dames/ Ladies Peace". Journeying to Cambrai again, Margaret reunited with Louise of Savoy, her sister-in-law and mother of Francis I. They negotiated the end of a war that France could no longer sustain; the Habsburgs lost Burgundy proper forever, but France gave up its claims to legal overlordship of Flanders, Artois and the "Free" County of Burgundy (Franche-Comté).

=== Economy ===
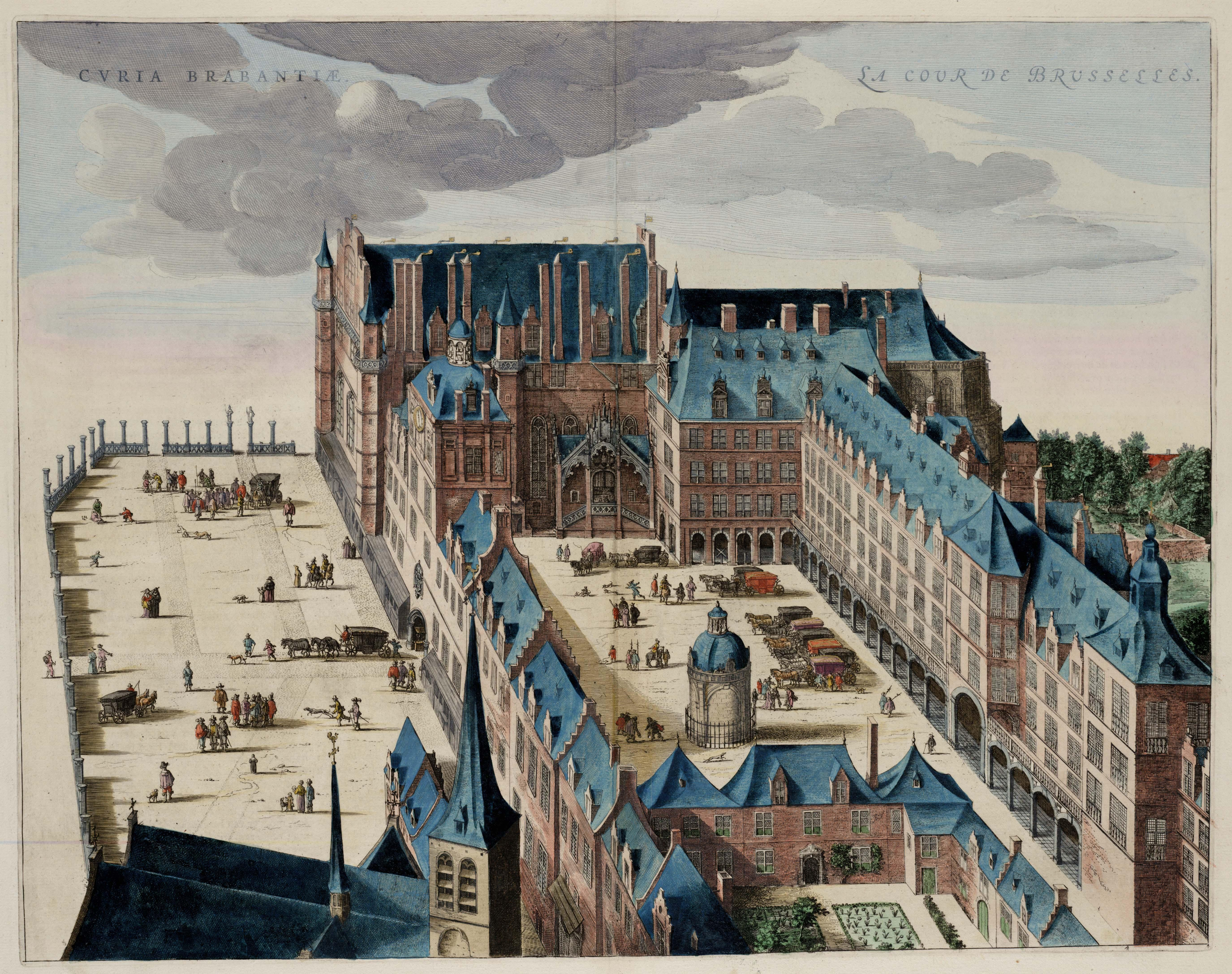
The Palace of Coudenberg, Brussels, as extended by Charles V, 1649.

Margaret had an aptitude for business, and maintained the prosperity of the Netherlands. She negotiated the restoration of the 1496 trade agreement known as the Intercursus Magnus with England, which was favorable to Flemish textile interests and brought huge profits. Because of the trade, industry and wealth of the regions and cities she oversaw, the Low Countries was an important source of income for the Imperial treasury.

In 1524, she signed a trade agreement with Frederick I of Denmark (the condition was that Holland would not support Christian II) that ensured the regular supply of grain into the Netherlands. Christian later managed to get the support from Charles V thanks to the efforts of his secretary Cornelis de Schepper, but Margaret refused to follow even Charles's order and insisted on placing the economical interests of the Netherlands above dynastic interests (Christian was the husband of Isabella of Austria, thus brother-in-law to Charles sister of Charles and nephew-in-law to Margaret).

Margaret provided funds and war supplies for her nephew's troops, especially against King Francis I of France and the German Protestants. In following years, Habsburg forces consolidated their hold over Tournai, Friesland, Utrecht, and Overijssel, which became part of the Habsburg Netherlands.

=== Internal conflict ===
Although the Low Countries was not previously centralized, Margaret's reign was a period of relative peace for the Netherlands. The exception was the beginning of the Protestant Reformation, especially in the north. The first martyrs, Jan van Essen and Hendrik Vos, were burnt at the stake in Brussels in 1523.

== Court ==
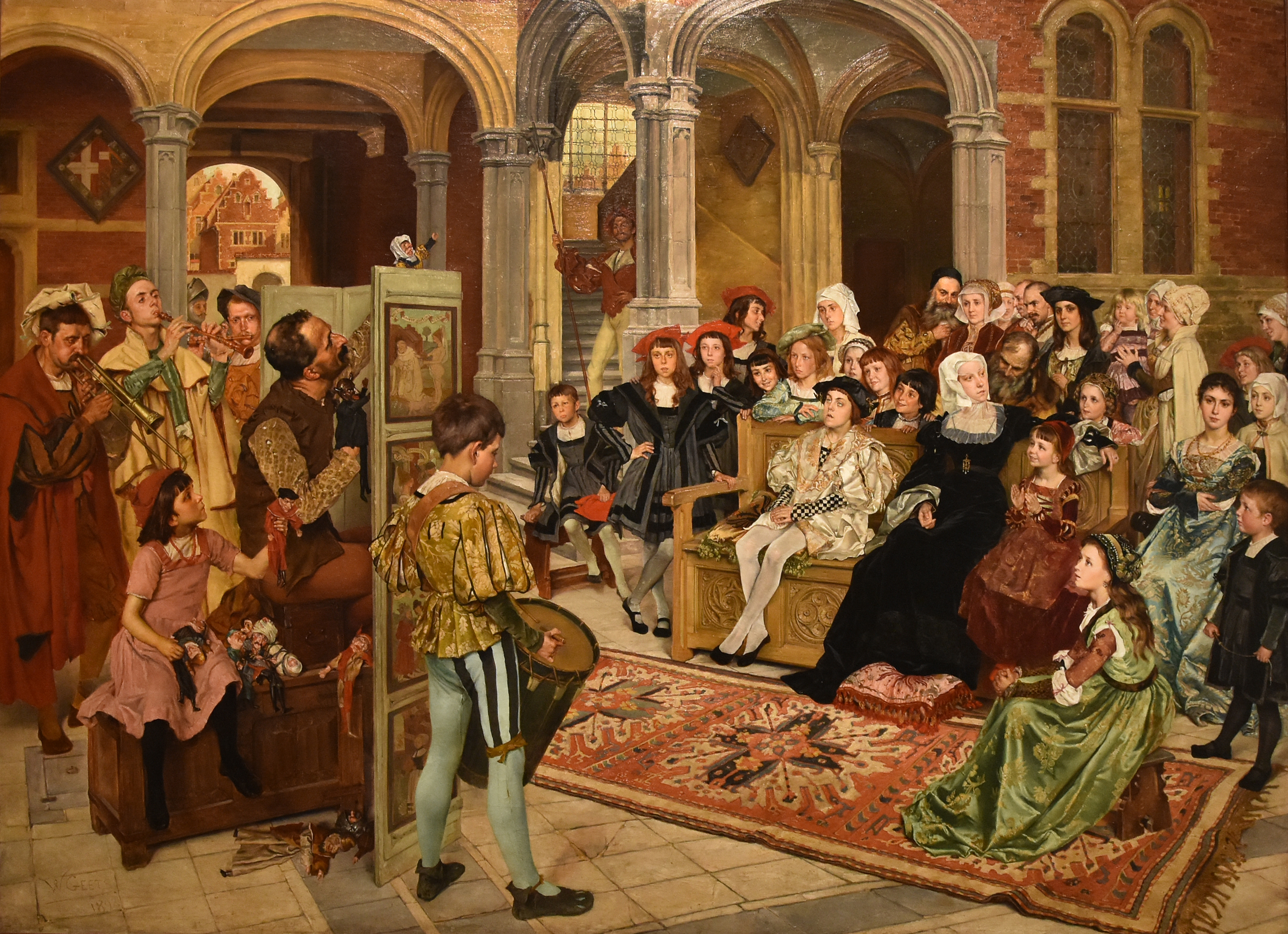
Willem Geets imagines (1892) a puppet show at Margaret's court; the future Charles V sits next to her, with his sisters alongside. The seated girl at right may be intended to be Anne Boleyn

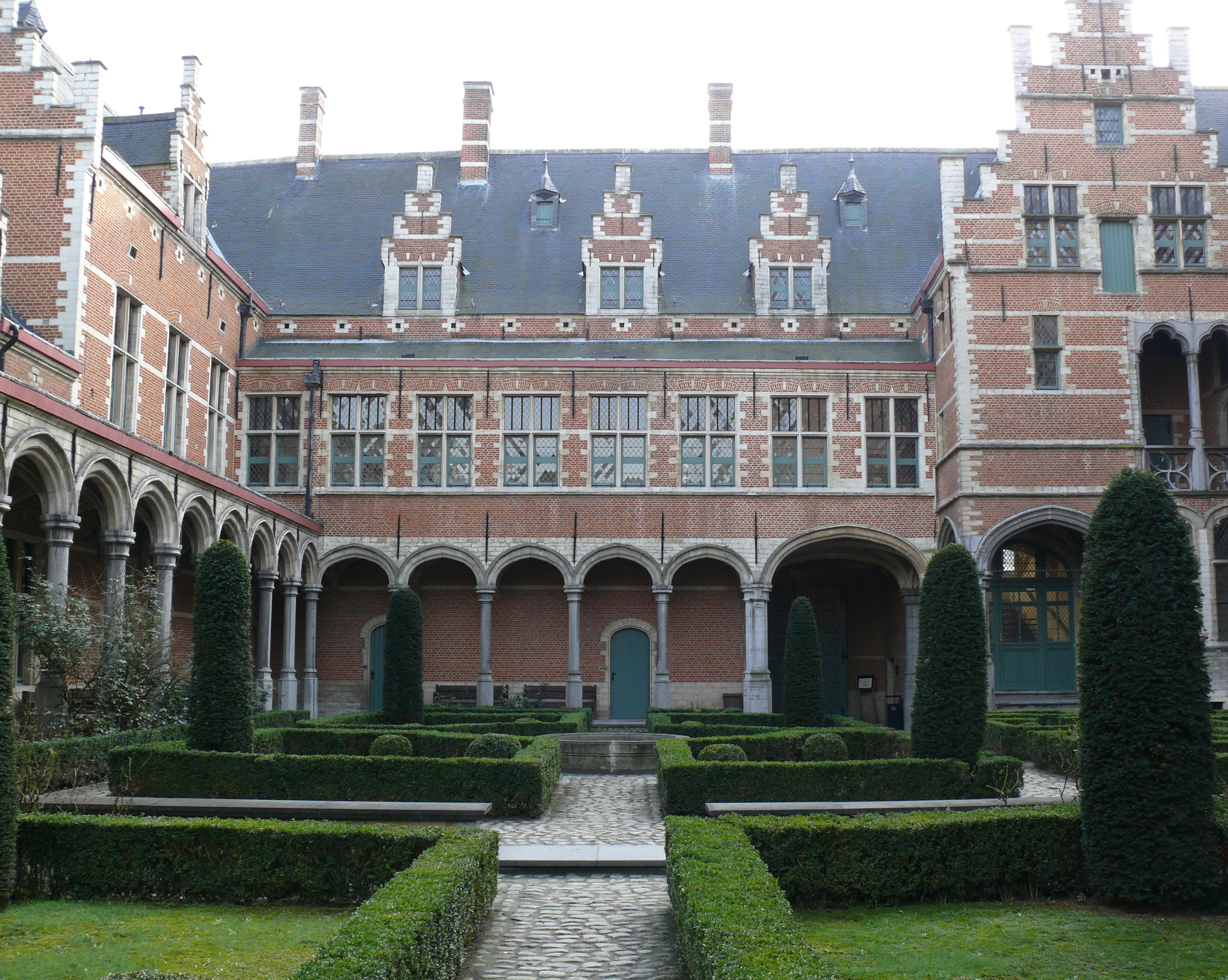
Courtyard of the Hof van Savoye, Mechelen

Margaret ended up raising her nephew and nieces in her palace in Mechelen, known as the "Court of Savoy". She was visited by the great humanists of her time, including Erasmus, Adrian of Utrecht (later Pope Adrian VI), and Heinrich Cornelius Agrippa. Agrippa dedicated his arguably feminist work "Declamation on the Nobility and Preeminence of the Female Sex" to her. The Governor was so impressed with diplomat Sir Thomas Boleyn's charm that she offered his daughter Anne Boleyn (future Queen consort of England) a temporary place in her household; she was there from the spring of 1513 to the late summer of 1514, when she moved to Paris. Margaret reported to her father that she was "so presentable and so pleasant, considering her youthful age, that I am more beholden to you for sending her to me, than you to me."

Once she was declared Governor of the Netherlands, Margaret purchased the Hof van Savoye, located in the Korte Maagdenstraat (Short Virgins Street) in Mechelen, which was to be her main residence. She found the existing palace too small and started an ambitious expansion campaign in 1507. From 1517 to 1530, the architect Rombout II Keldermans furthered the project along the Keizerstraat (Emperor Street) and modified what became the rear wing, which faces the Palace of Margaret of York.

== Patronage of the arts ==
Margaret owned or controlled a very significant art collection, which she expanded considerably; the ownership of works inherited by her or Charles V from their Burgundian ancestors is not always clear. Most of this was left to Charles and her niece and successor as governor, Mary of Hungary, and in 1558 inherited by Philip II of Spain, to become part of the Spanish Royal collection, with some eventually going to the Habsburg imperial collections in Vienna. Many of the Flemish paintings of before 1530 in the Prado in Madrid passed through the collection. The smaller collection in her palace in Mechelen is unusually well understood through surviving inventories, made in 1499, 1516 and 1523–24. The last of these locates the room, and sometimes the exact position, of works, and includes frank opinions on the quality of the more important that suggest Margaret herself made them.

The 1523–24 inventory records a total of 385 paintings, sculptures, tapestries and embroideries (not counting prints and drawings), 132 exotic natural objects and artefacts such as Aztec feather work and carved coral. These, one of the earliest collections of objects from the New World, came via Hernán Cortés, who presented Charles V with treasures received from the Aztec King Moctezuma in 1519. Several of these treasures were sent to Mechelen as a gift from her nephew in 1523. Clocks, board games and "curiosities" made up 47 items, and there were 380 items in her library, including manuscripts, printed books and charts such as genealogies. Then there was a good quantity of metal items such as dining "plate", much of it silver-gilt.

The Arnolfini Portrait, a gift from Diego de Guevara by 1516

The collection was carefully laid out as a "proto-museum", and it appears Margaret often gave notable visitors guided tours herself. There was a large number of portraits of Margaret's Burgundian ancestors, her Habsburg contemporaries, and her two husbands and their relatives. There were also seven portraits of members of the Tudor dynasty, and Louis XII of France and his daughter Claude of France, as well as portraits of some of her officials. Most of all these were probably gifts from the sitters, just as Margaret gave copies of her own portraits.

Much the most famous painting in her collection was the Arnolfini Portrait, a 1434 oil on panel painting by the Early Netherlandish painter Jan van Eyck, now in the National Gallery, London. It is a full-length double portrait, believed to depict the Italian merchant Giovanni di Nicolao Arnolfini and his wife, presumably in their residence at the Flemish city of Bruges. It was the first item in the 1516 inventory, described as "a large picture which is called Hernoul le Fin with his wife in a chamber, which was given to Madame by Don Diego, whose arms are on the cover of the said picture; done by the painter Johannes." A note in the margin says "It is necessary to put on a lock to close it: which Madame has ordered to be done." The identification of the sitter rests entirely on this and a similar note in the later inventory of 1523-24 (where Arnolfini is now "Arnoult Fin"). This was inherited by Mary of Hungary, and then Philip II of Spain, remaining in the Spanish royal collection until looted in the Napoleonic Wars by the French, and then apparently re-looted from them by the British.

Although she lived during the less distinguished end of the period of Early Netherlandish painting, she had several painters at her court, including the Master of the Legend of the Magdalen and Pieter van Coninxloo, mainly portrait painters (it is possible they were the same person). Seven versions survive of her portrait in widow's costume (the deuil blanc or "white mourning" veils) by Bernaert van Orley of about 1515-1520; the prime version is believed to be that at Brou, while others would have been sent as gifts to her relations, other rulers and perhaps friends. Van Orley, arguably the leading Brussels painter of the day, became her court artist in 1518. The workshop version of the portrait in the British Royal Collection (loaned to the National Portrait Gallery, London) is "probably" the same as that recorded in a 1543 inventory of Henry VIII.

The German sculptor Conrad Meit worked for her for many years, and was greatly involved in her main architectural project, the monastery at Brou. He carved the effigies on her tomb, and several other portraits of her, including intimate small busts in pearwood.

=== Library ===
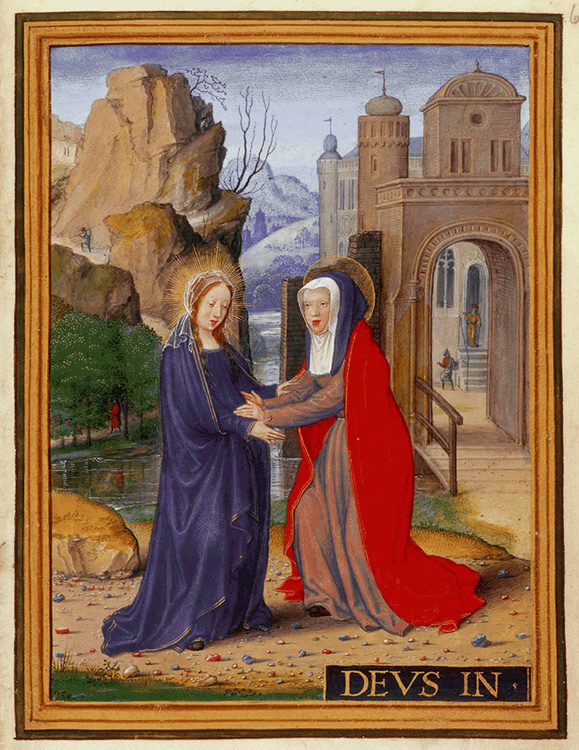
The Visitation from the Sforza Hours, by Gerard Horenbout. Margaret is portrayed as Elizabeth on the right

Like other women in the royal houses of France, Spain and Burgundy Margaret possessed a very rich library for the period, in her case including a group of illuminated manuscripts that are supreme masterpieces in several styles. She was an important patron of the Ghent–Bruges school of manuscript painters, at the peak of their achievement in the first years of the 16th century, and inherited or was given key works from earlier periods. She inherited most of the books of her step-grandmother Margaret of York, Duchess of Burgundy, and others from her mother, including the Hours of Mary of Burgundy (now National Library of Austria). She returned from her period in Savoy with the famous Très Riches Heures du duc de Berry, which had belonged to (and was added to by) Charles I, Duke of Savoy (d. 1490), father of Philibert's first wife.

Already in 1499 an inventory recorded six books of hours, a missal, and a breviary. She also collected poetry, historical and ethical treatises, which included the works of Christine de Pizan.

She was given the incomplete Sforza Hours (now British Library) by Bona of Savoy, widowed Duchess of Milan, who had commissioned it around 1490; Margaret had her court artist Gerard Horenbout complete it, probably in 1517–20, several years after she received it in Savoy. It is thought very likely that the Spinola Hours (Getty Museum) was commissioned by her in the 1510s.

In his travel journal of 1517–1518, the Italian canon Antonio de Beatis described Margaret's "highly decorated library for women. The books are all written in French and bound in velvet with silver-gilt clasps".

She possessed several chansonniers that contained works by Josquin des Prez, Johannes Ockeghem, Jacob Obrecht and Pierre de la Rue, who was her favourite composer. Margaret ordered several splendid music manuscripts from Pierre Alamire to send as gifts to her relatives and political relations.

Margaret's manuscripts

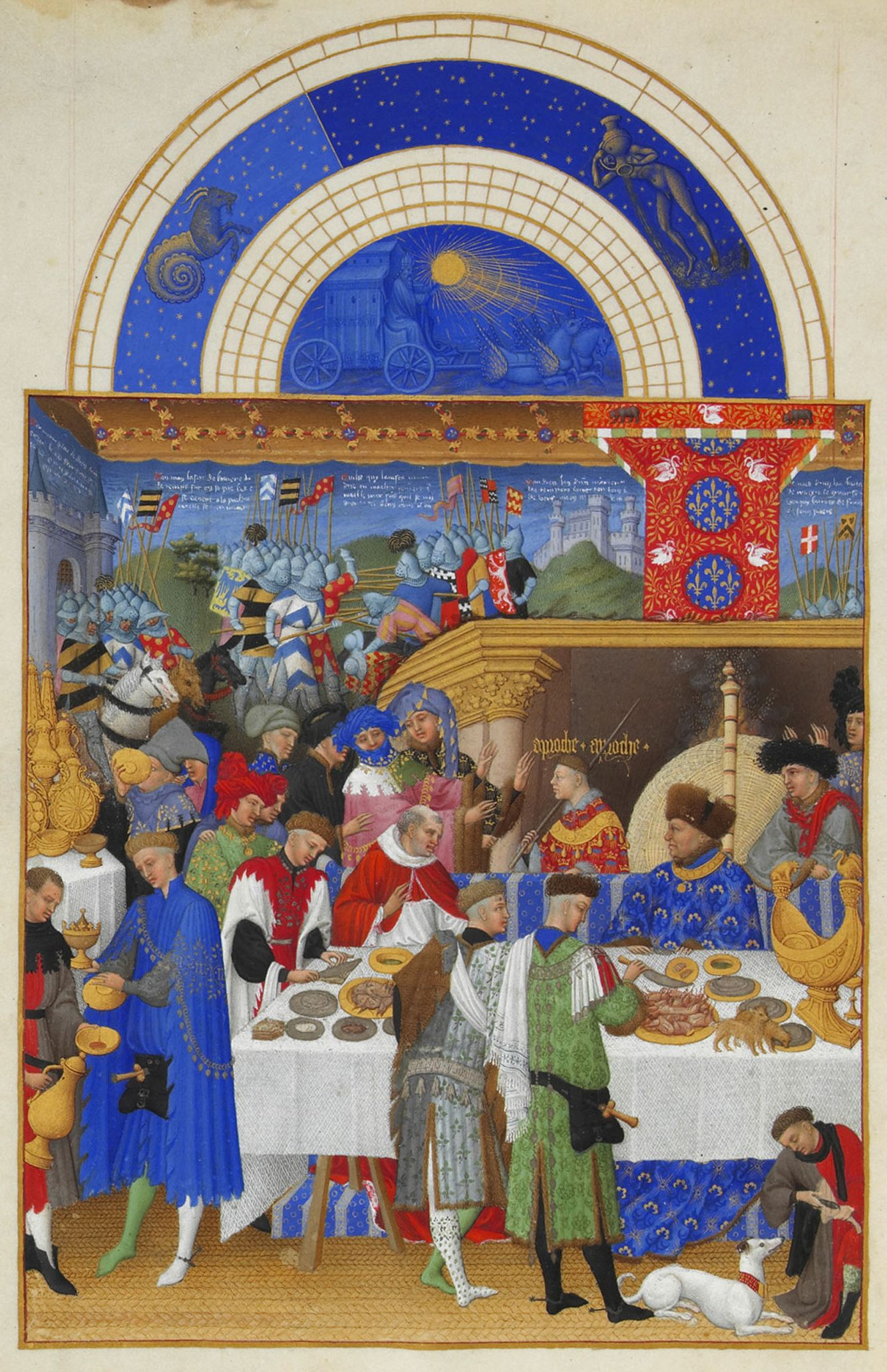
January calendar page, Très Riches Heures du duc de Berry; the household of John, Duke of Berry (right in blue), exchanging New Year gifts, 1410s

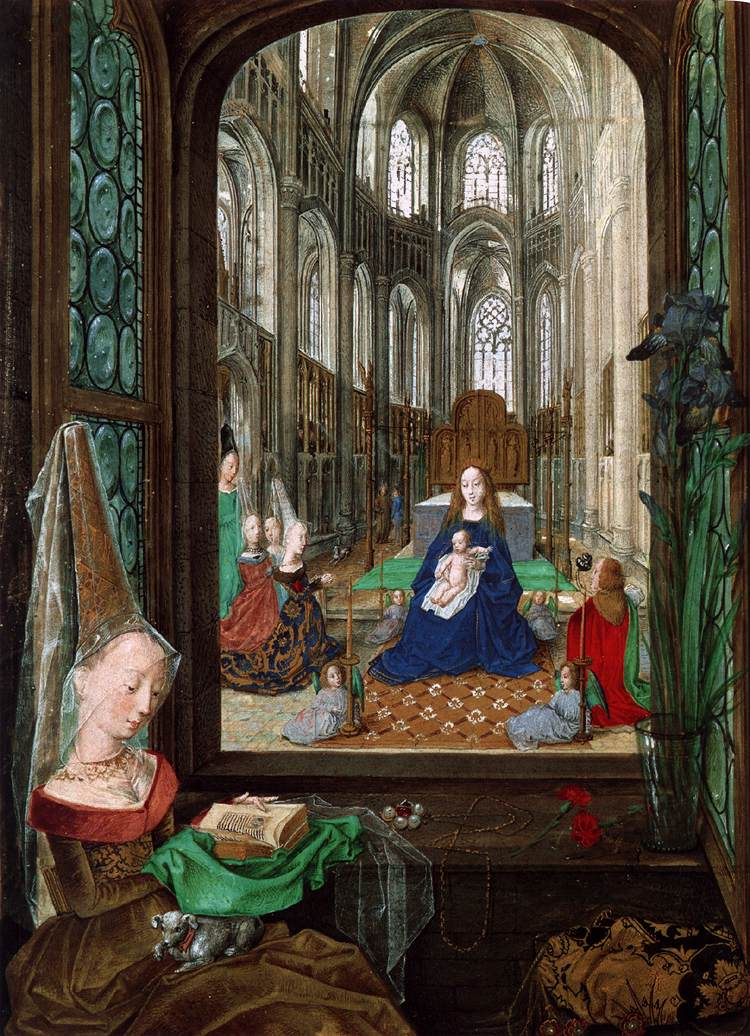
Hours of Mary of Burgundy (now National Library of Austria), Folio 14v: The Virgin in a church with Mary of Burgundy at her devotions, c. 1477

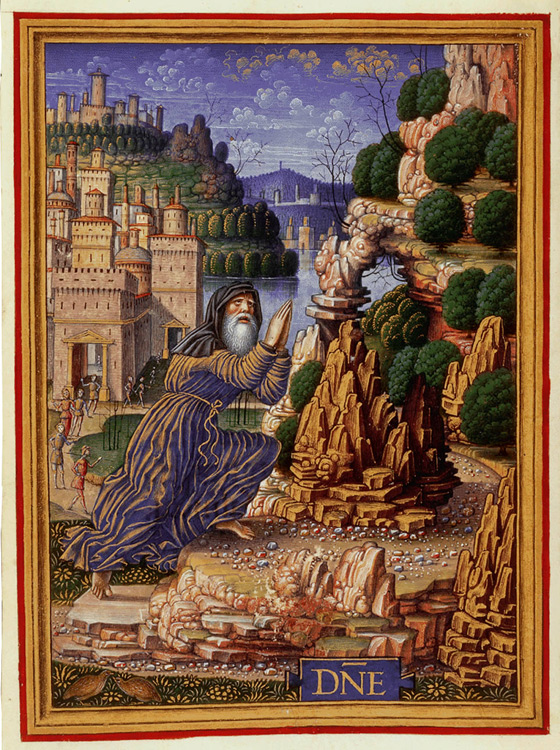
Sforza Hours, first campaign c. 1490, King David in Penitence, by Giovanni Pietro Birago

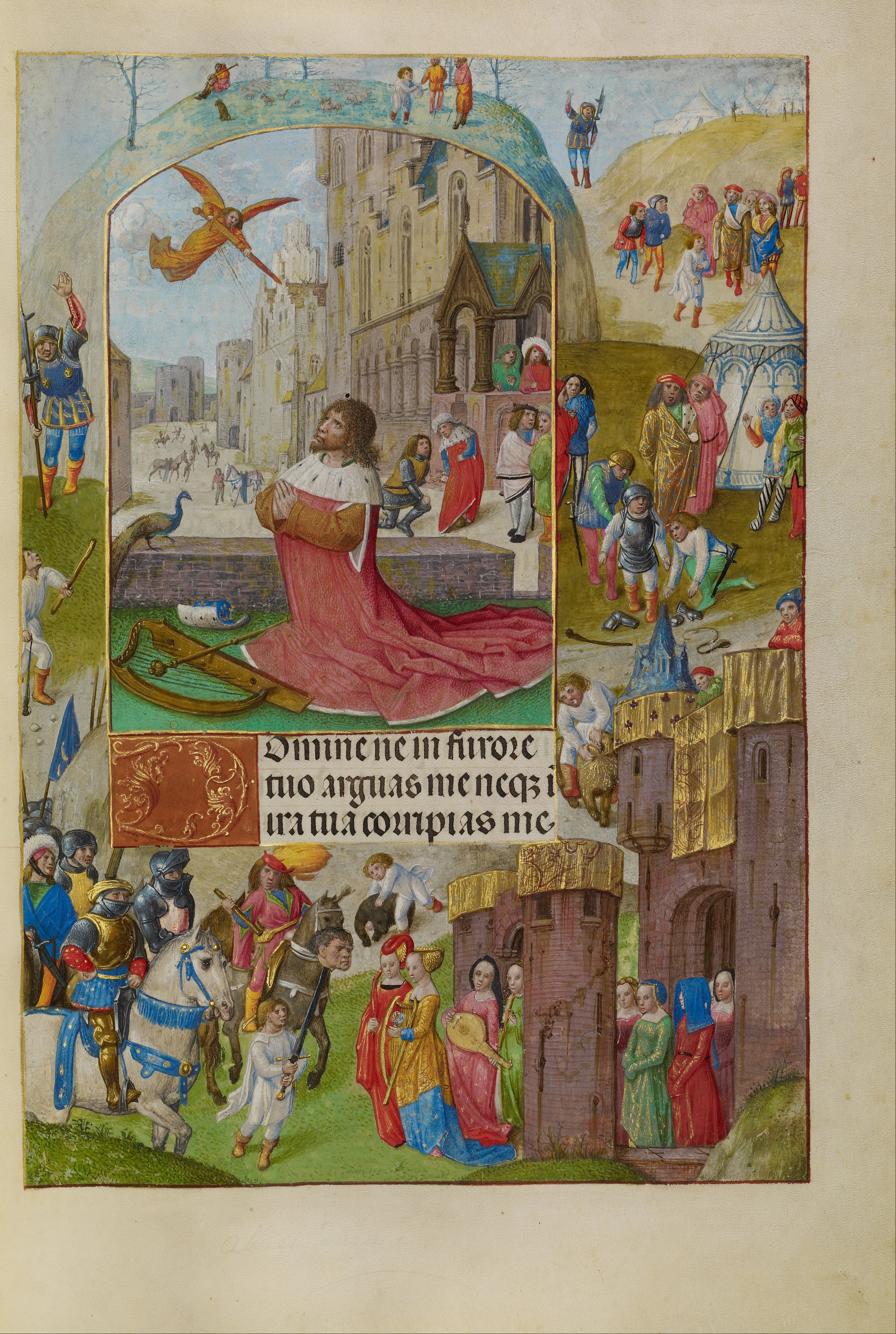
Master of the Lübeck Bible, Scenes from the life of King David, Spinola Hours, perhaps 1513–1521

=== Portraits ===
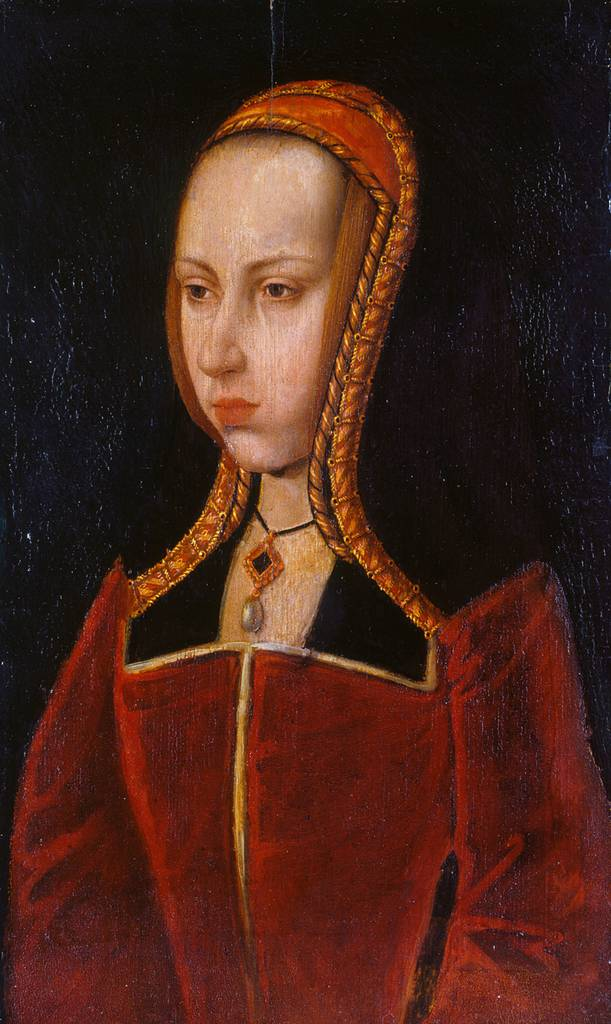
Attributed to Pieter van Coninxloo, c. 1500; the portrait sent to Henry VII of England

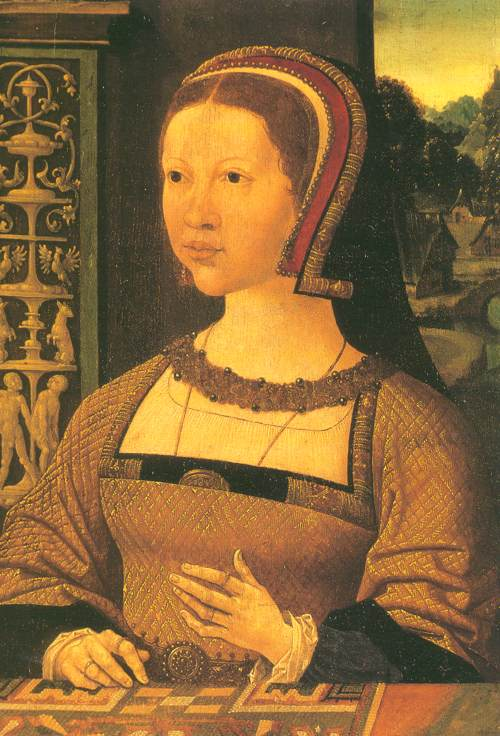
Before 1525

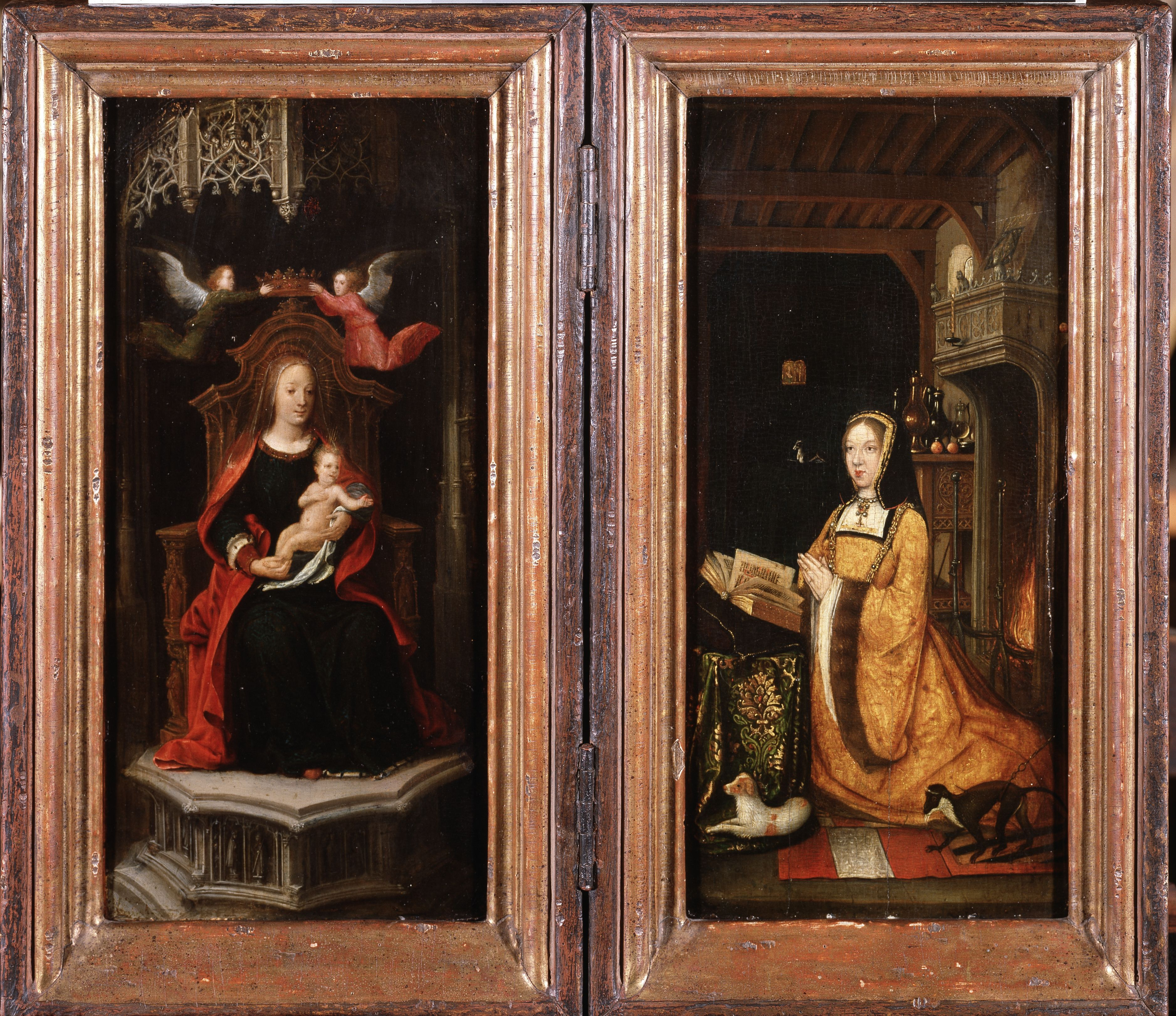
At prayer, "Master of 1499", a Southern Netherlands artist, 1510s; Museum of Fine Arts, Ghent

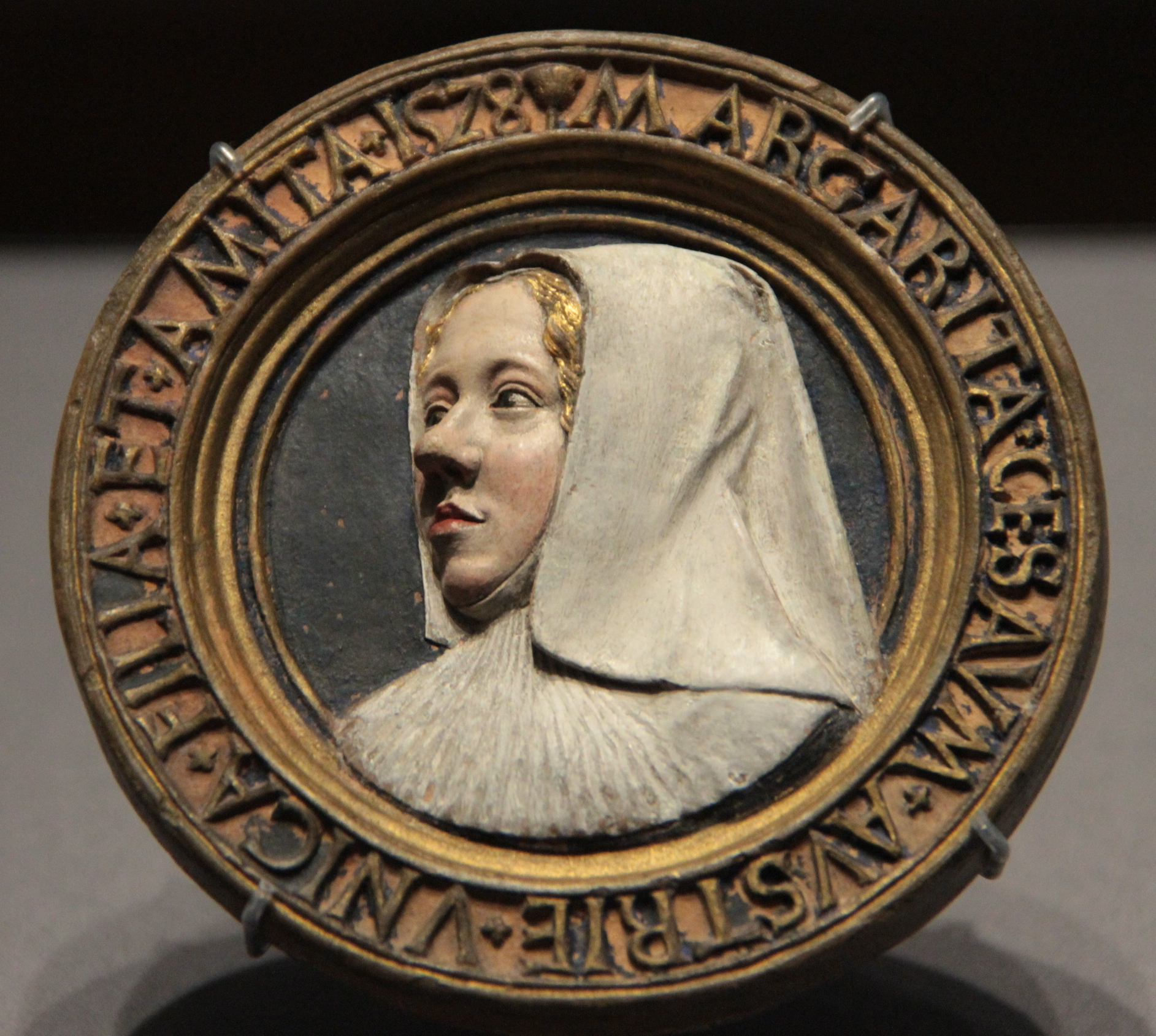
Small painted relief by Conrat Meit

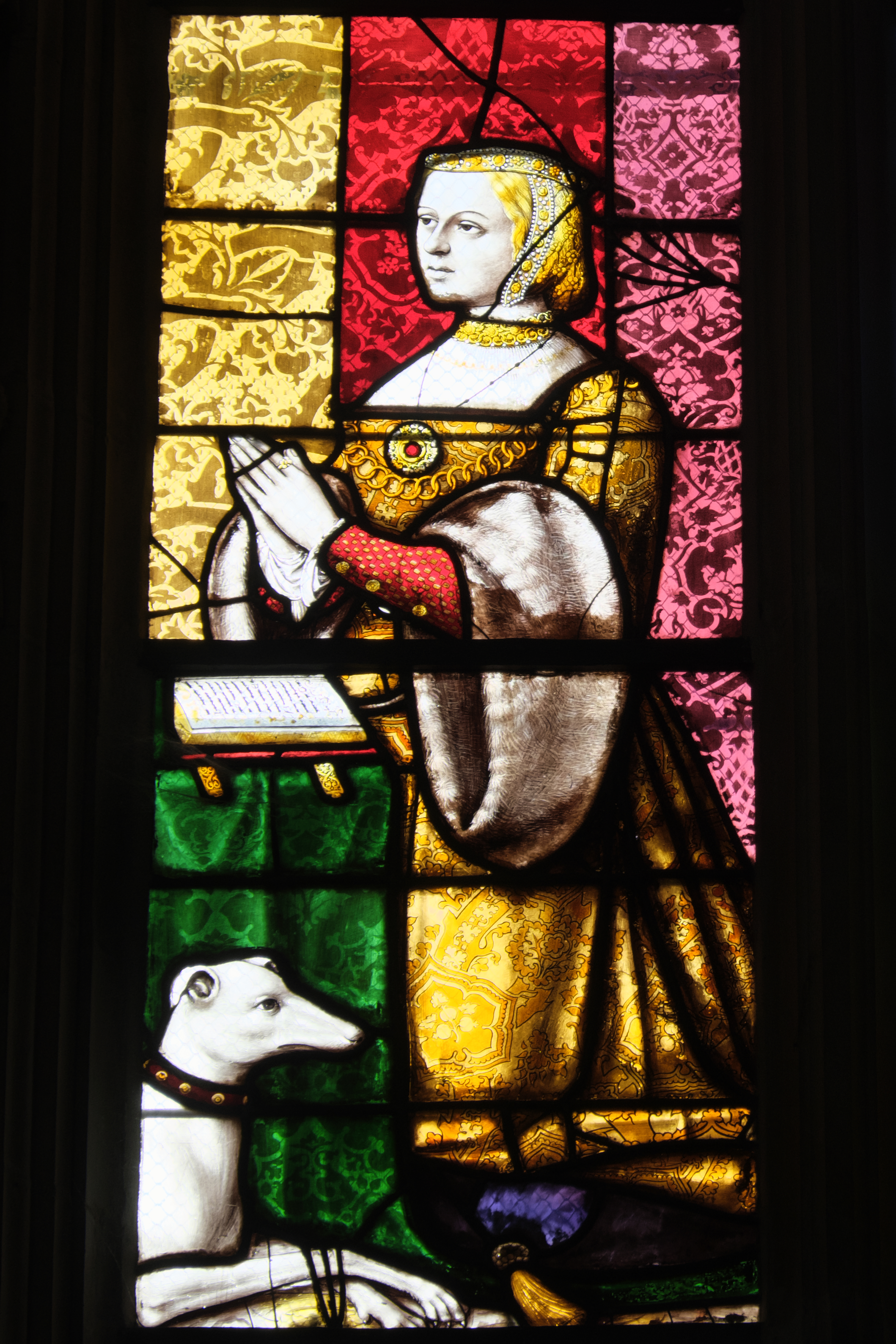
Margaret at prayer, window at Brou, after 1525

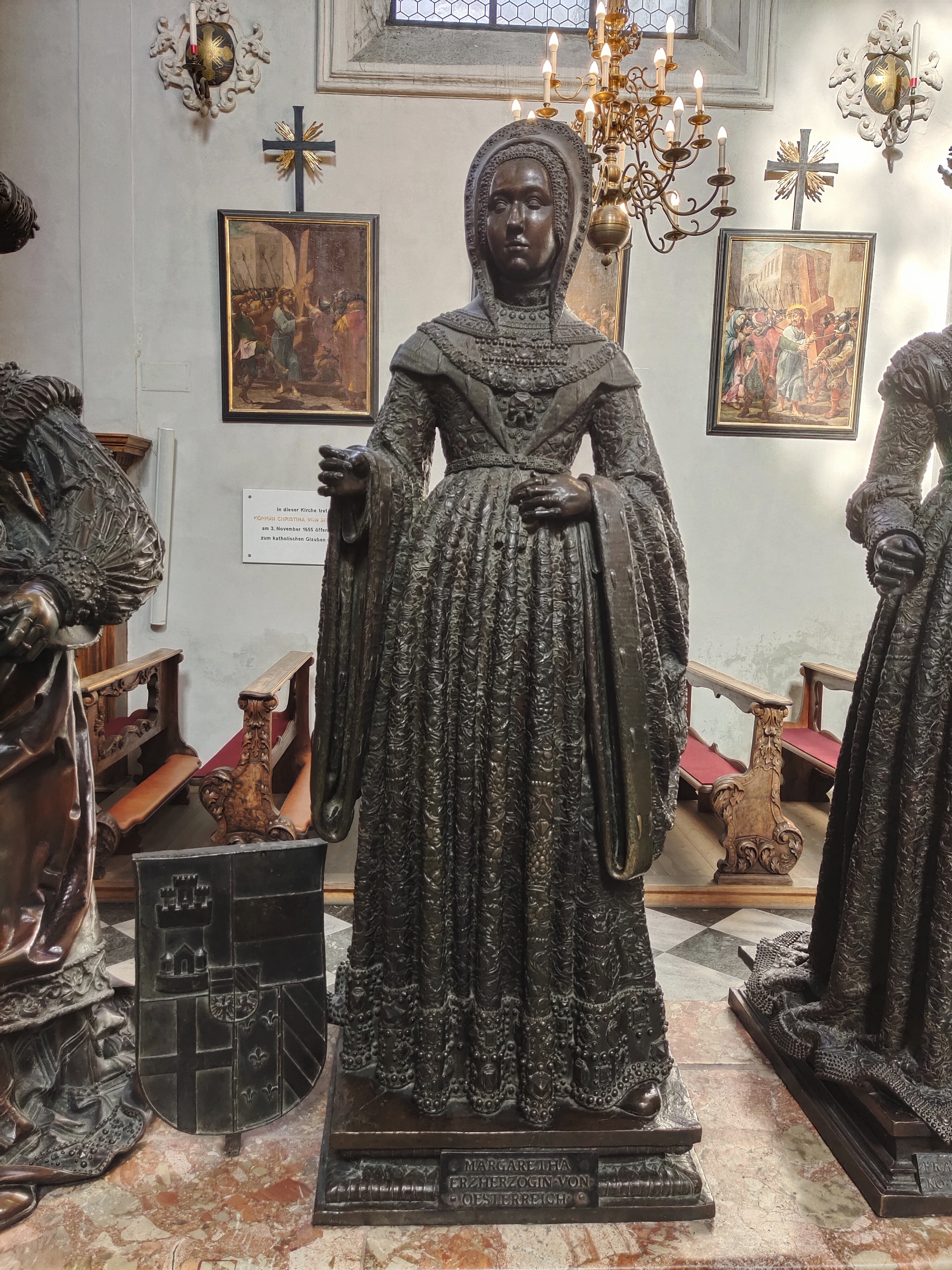
Bronze statue at her father's cenotaph, Innsbruck, 1522

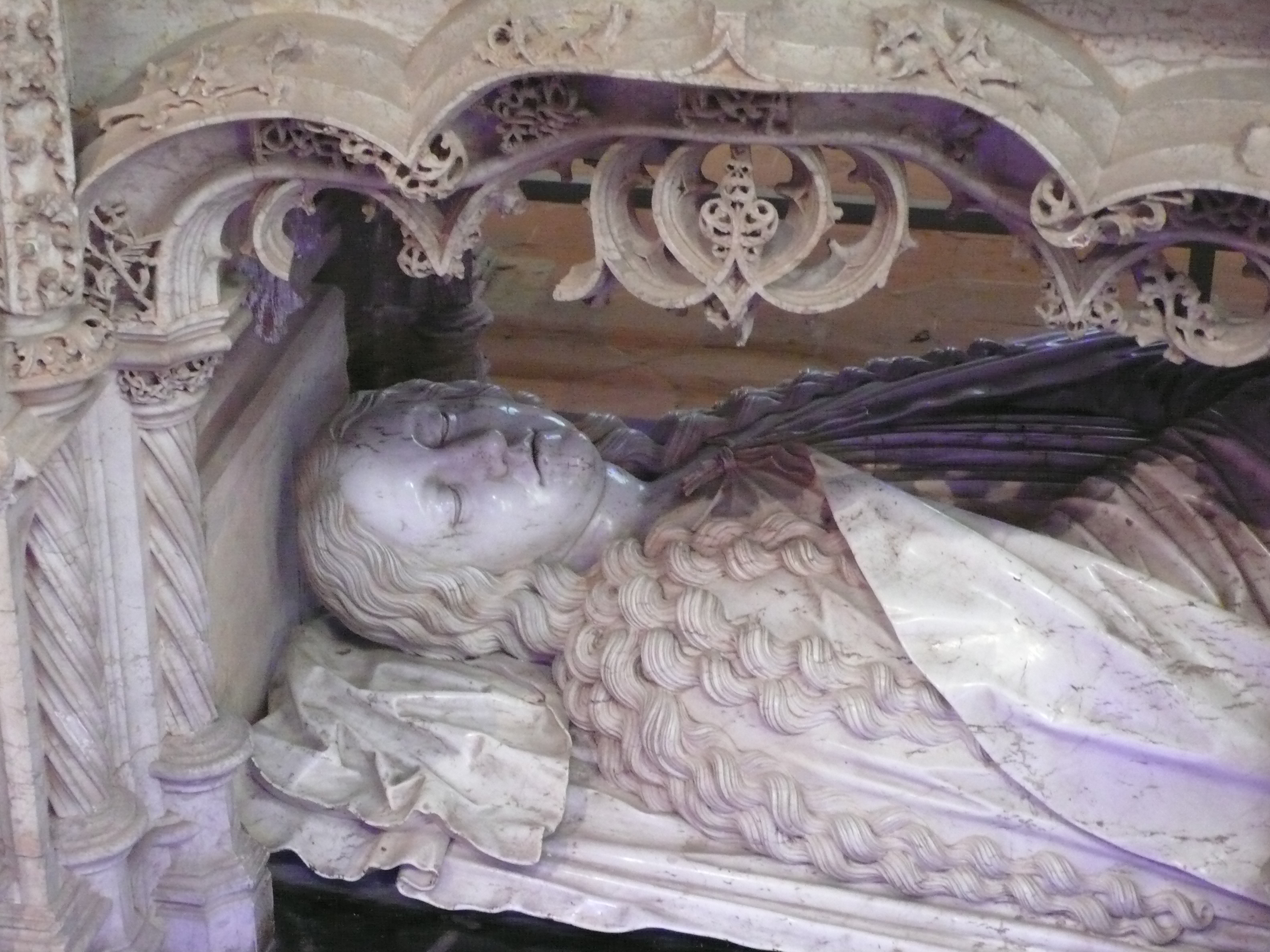
The lower effigy on her tomb, Conrat Meit

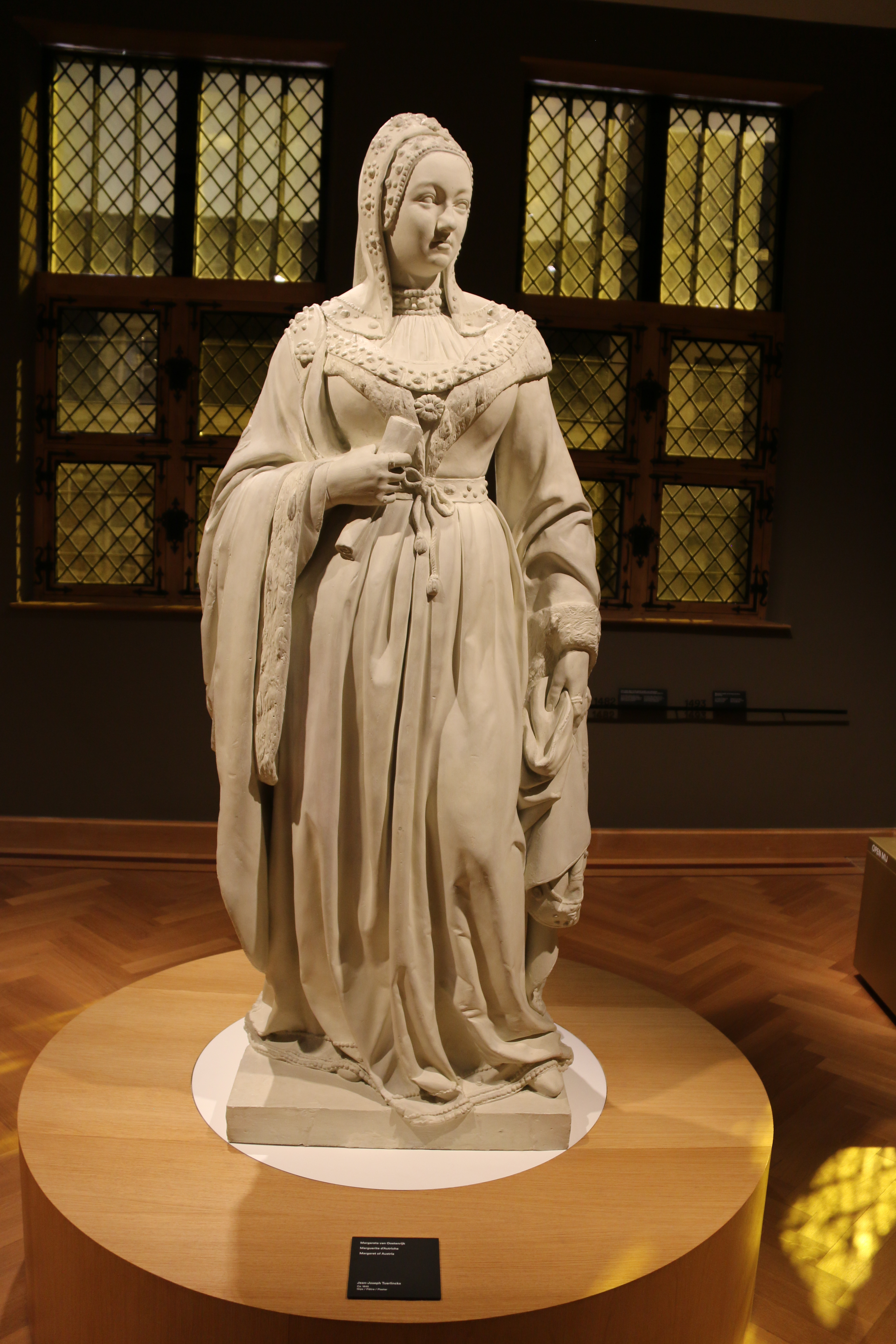
Plaster study, c. 1845, for the Mechelen statue

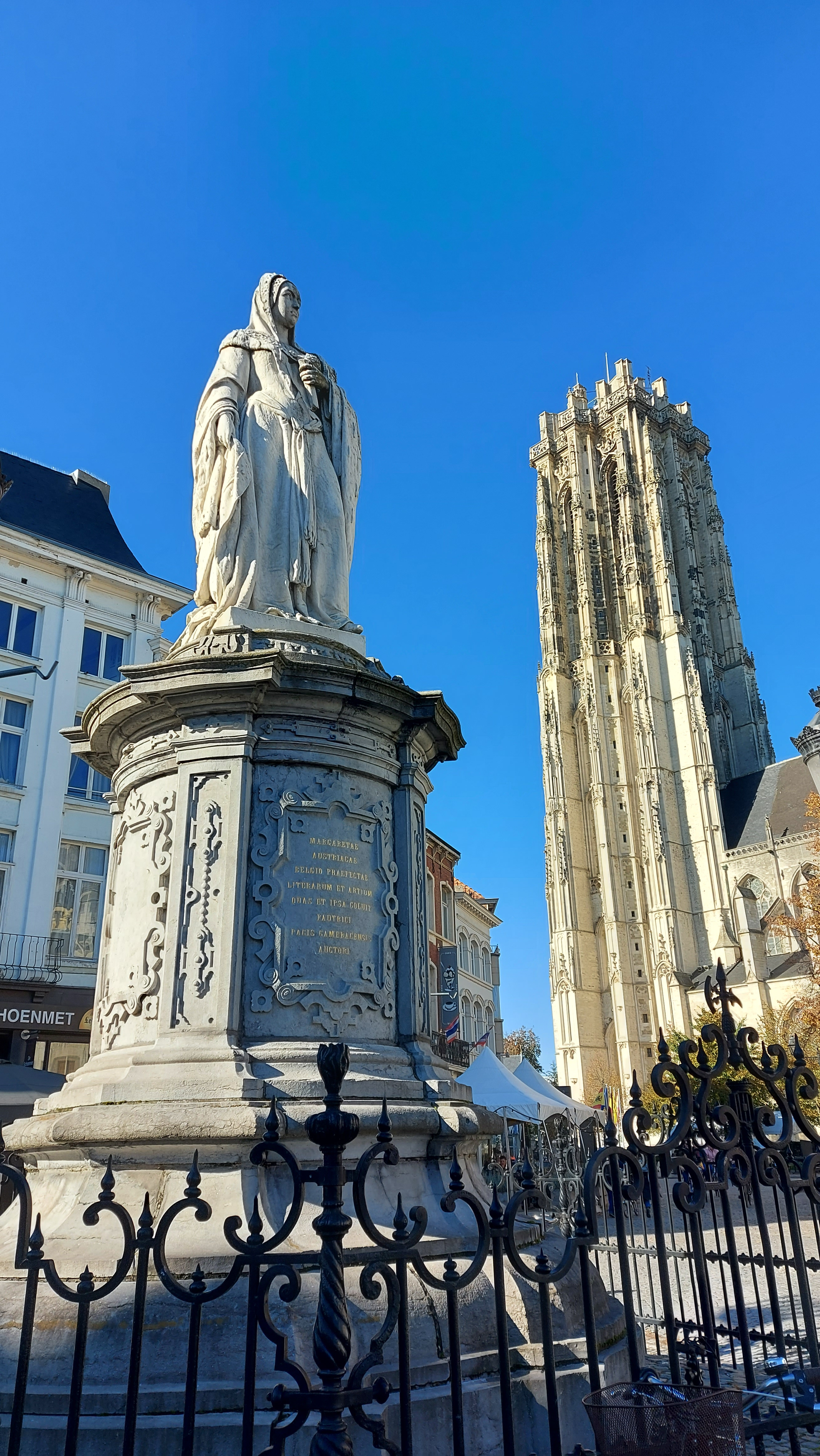
Statue of 1849 in the market square of Mechelen, St. Rumbold's Cathedral behind

== Death and burial ==
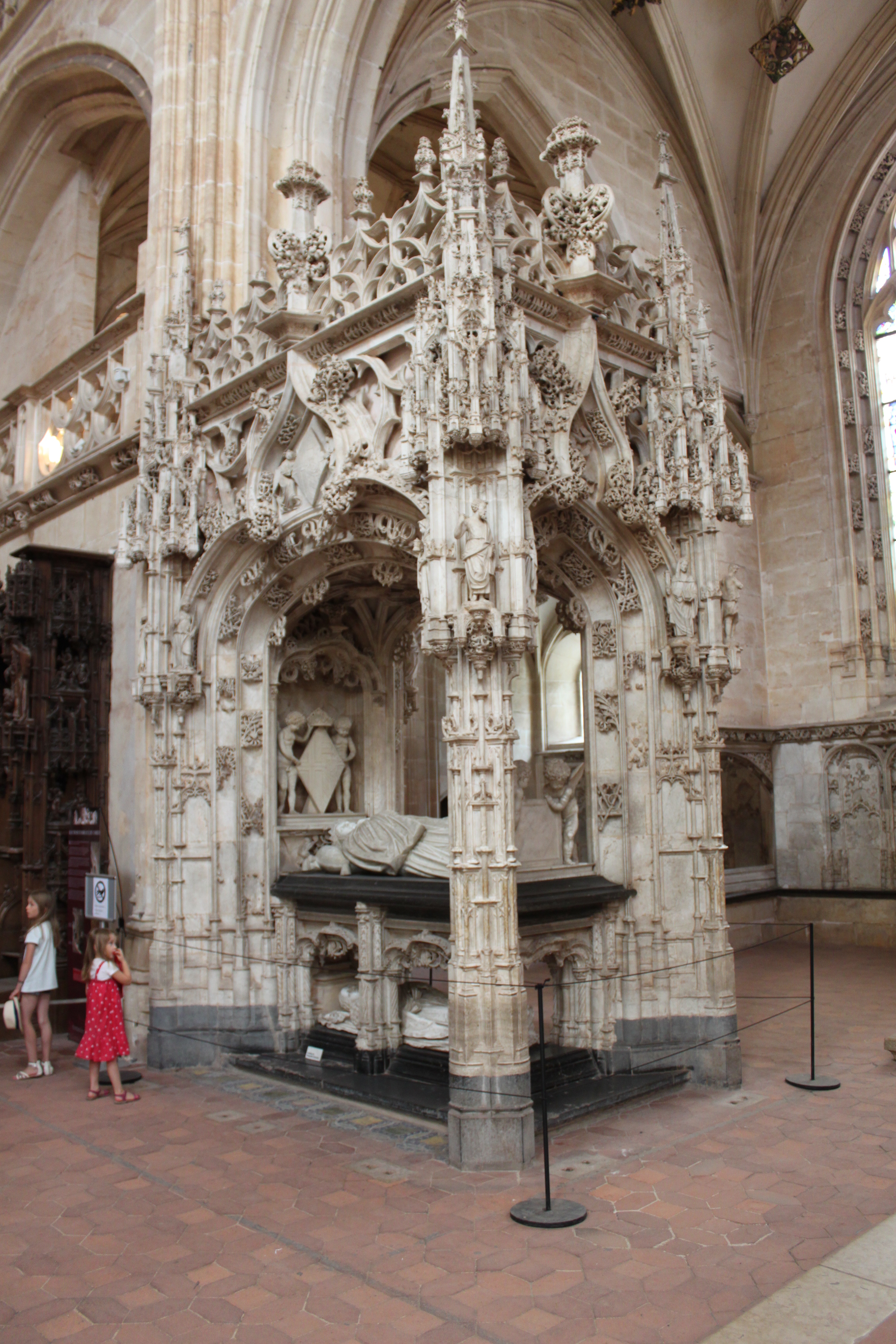
Tomb of Margaret of Austria, Monastery of Brou, Bourg-en-Bresse, with two effigies, above and below

On 15 November 1530, Margaret stepped on a piece of broken glass. She initially thought little of the injury but gangrene set in and the leg had to be amputated. She decided to arrange all her affairs first, designating Charles V as her sole heir and writing him a letter in which she asked him to maintain peace with France and England. On the night of 30 November, the doctors came to operate on her. They gave her a dose of opium to lessen the pain, but it was reportedly so strong that she would not wake up again. She died between midnight and one o'clock.

She was succeeded as governor by Charles's sister Mary of Hungary (or of Austria), then 25, another widow who was recalled after her husband Louis II of Hungary was killed in the Battle of Mohacs against the Turks in 1526.

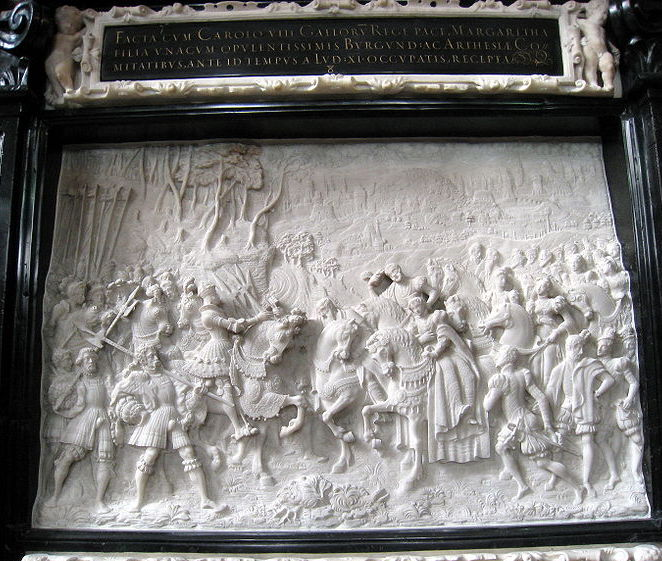
Margaret's return to her father in 1493, marble relief by Alexander Colyn, based on a woodcut from The Triumphal Arch by Albrecht Dürer) on Maximilian's cenotaph in Innsbruck

Margaret was buried alongside her second husband at Bourg-en-Bresse, in the mausoleum of the Royal Monastery of Brou that she previously commissioned. Her very elaborate tomb was by Conrat Meit, her court sculptor for many years. It has two reclining effigies, the upper in formal regalia as Duchess of Savoy, and the lower as if asleep, with her hair down.

There is a standing bronze statue of Margaret of Austria in the group around the cenotaph of her father Maximilian I, Holy Roman Emperor, in the Hofkirche, Innsbruck, which also has a relief panel of her return from France after the French marriage proposal collapsed. Clive Holland remarks that it must have required courage to place the scene next to depictions of the father's triumphs, as at the time the rejection was a bitter experience for them both. There is a statue of 1849 of Margaret next to St. Rumbold's Cathedral in Mechelen, Belgium.

== Heraldry ==
Arms as a single lady (before 1496)

Arms as princess of Spain (1496-1501)

Arms as duchess of Savoy (after 1501)

Arms as countess of Burgundy and Artois (after 1509)

== Depiction in media ==
Margaret of Austria is portrayed by Spanish actress Úrsula Corberó in the TV show Isabel.

A wildly inaccurate fictionalized version of Margaret can be found in the play The Unhappy Penitent by Catharine Trotter, where she appears as the character 'Margarite'. In the play, Margarite is in love with René II, Duke of Lorraine, although there is no indication that the two ever met. Also, the Duke of Brittany is in love with Margarite, but he died in 1488, when the historical Margaret was eight. He was the father of Anne of Brittany, later Margaret's replacement, who came to France to marry Charles VIII; her father's death without a male heir is what spurred the various betrothals of Anne.

In The White Princess series she is portrayed by Zazie Hayhurst.

== Ancestry ==
Ancestors of Margaret of Austria, Duchess of Savoy

8. Ernest, Duke of Austria
4. Frederick III, Holy Roman Emperor
9. Cymburgis of Masovia
2. Maximilian I, Holy Roman Emperor
10. Edward I of Portugal
5. Eleanor of Portugal
11. Eleanor of Aragon
1. Margaret of Austria
12. Philip III, Duke of Burgundy
6. Charles I, Duke of Burgundy
13. Isabella of Portugal
3. Mary, Duchess of Burgundy
14. Charles I, Duke of Bourbon
7. Isabella of Bourbon
15. Agnes of Burgundy

== Notes ==
Margaret of Austria, Duchess of Savoy House of Habsburg Born: 10 January 1480 Died: 1 December 1530
Political offices
Preceded by William de Croÿ	Governor of the Habsburg Netherlands; 1507–1530	Succeeded by Mary of Hungary
Italian nobility
Preceded by Yolande Louise of Savoy	Duchess consort of Savoy; 1501–1504	Vacant Title next held by Beatrice of Portugal
