= Liscard =

Area of Wallasey, England

Coordinates: 53.419°N 3.047°W

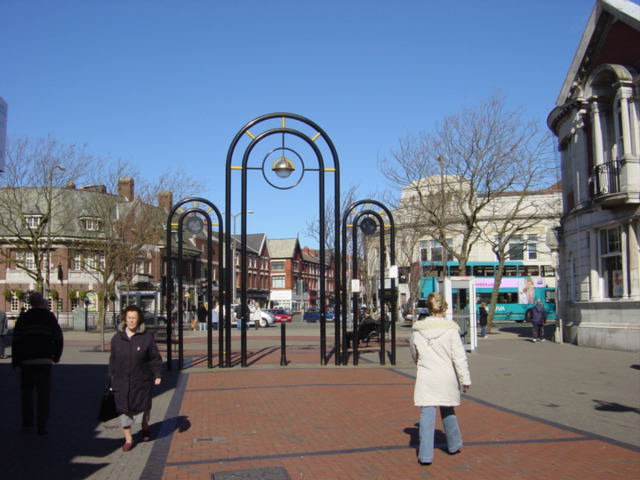
- Liscard shopping centre

- Location within Merseyside
- Population: 15,510 (2021 census - Ward population)
- OS grid reference: SJ307919
  - London: 180 mi (290 km) SE
- Metropolitan borough: Wirral
- Metropolitan county: Merseyside
- Region: North West
- Country: England
- Sovereign state: United Kingdom
- Post town: WALLASEY
- Postcode district: CH44
- Dialling code: 0151
- ISO 3166 code: GB-WRL
- Police: Merseyside
- Fire: Merseyside
- Ambulance: North West
- UK Parliament: Wallasey

Liscard is an area of the town of Wallasey, in the Metropolitan Borough of Wirral, Merseyside, England. The most centrally located of Wallasey's townships, it is the main shopping area of the town, with many shops located in the Cherry Tree Shopping Centre. At the 2001 census the population of Liscard local government ward was recorded at 15,510, increasing to 15,574 at the 2011 census.

== History ==
The first mention of the settlement was circa 1260 as Lisnekarke. The name is from Welsh Llys carreg, with the name meaning "hall at the rock" or "...cliff". In the past the name has been spelt as Liscak (1260), Lisecair (c.1277), Lysenker (1295) and Lyscart (1417).

Liscard was formerly a township and chapelry in the parish of Wallasey, in the Wirral Hundred, in 1866 Liscard became a separate civil parish, on 1 April 1912 the parish was abolished and merged with Wallasey and became part of the County Borough of Wallasey. The population was recorded as 211 in 1801, 4,100 in 1851, 28,661 in 1901 and 38,659 in 1911.

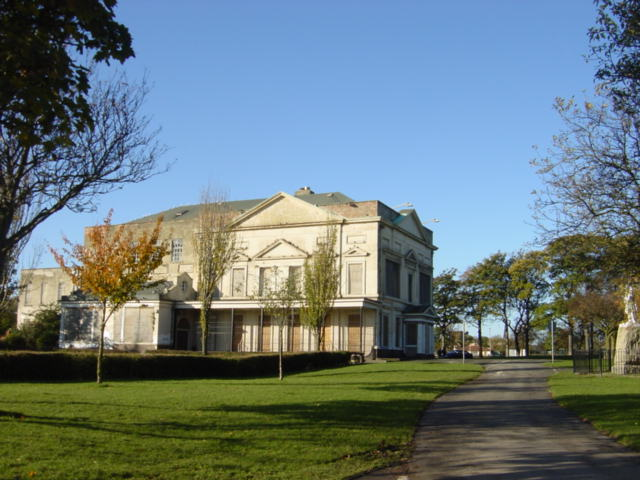
Liscard Hall (now demolished)

Liscard Hall was built in 1835 by a Liverpool merchant, Sir John Tobin. Its grounds later became Central Park. A "model farm" was also developed nearby by the Tobin family. The former Grade II listed mansion later became an art college within Central Park. It was damaged by a suspicious fire on 7 July 2008 after being left empty and inadequately secured by Wirral Council and was subsequently demolished. The site has since been grassed over.

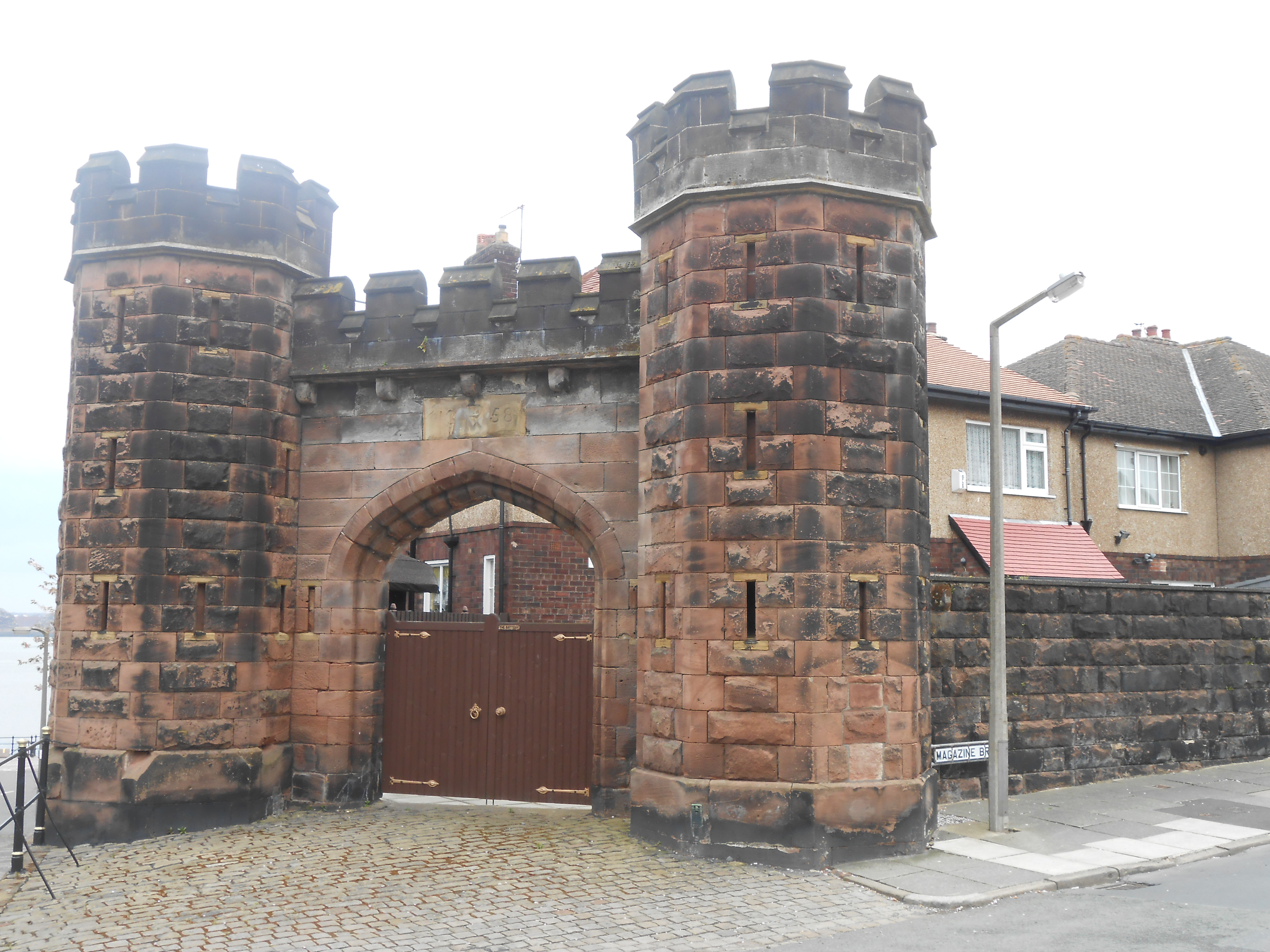
Gateway to the former Battery compound

Liscard Battery was built in 1858 to help protect shipping on the River Mersey and defend the port of Liverpool. It was equipped with seven 10-inch guns. Set back from the river and hidden by new building, it was known as "the snake in the grass" to local inhabitants. The battery was obsolete by 1912, and sold on and houses were erected on top, and now the site has an odd appearance with only the curtain wall and ornate crenellated gatehouse surviving. This gateway was designated a Grade II listed building in 1988.

Liscard and Poulton railway station on the Wirral Railway opened to passengers in 1895. Consisting of a single island platform in a cutting, it was part of a branch line with Seacombe railway station as its terminus. This branch closed to passengers in 1960 and to freight in 1963. Its route now forms the approach road to the Kingsway Tunnel.

== Geography ==
Liscard is in the north-eastern part of the Wirral Peninsula, less than 2.5 km (1.6 mi) south-south-east of the Irish Sea at New Brighton, about 11 km (6.8 mi) east-north-east of the Dee Estuary at West Kirby and about 1 km (0.62 mi) west-north-west of the River Mersey at Egremont. Liscard is situated at an elevation of around 35 m (115 ft) above sea level.

Liscard is situated 4.8 km (3 mi) from Birkenhead, and 6.4 km (4 mi) from Liverpool via the Kingsway Tunnel.

== Governance ==
Liscard is part of the Wallasey parliamentary constituency and represented since 1992 by Angela Eagle, a Labour Party MP, who retained her seat in the 2015 general election.

The area is also a local government ward of the Metropolitan Borough of Wirral, taking in the majority of Egremont. As of 2026, Liscard is represented by two Labour Party councillors. The most recent local elections took place on 6 May 2021.

== Community ==
The area is largely residential and contains mainly high-density semi-detached and terraced housing. Central Park is now the largest park in Wallasey, It has two areas for young children, with swings, slides and other games, large areas of greenery and a popular walled garden. There is also a cricket ground and a large duck pond. It links Liscard to Poulton and Egremont.

=== Education ===
Liscard includes the Oldershaw Academy, a secondary school with specialist status as a Business and Enterprise College and Liscard Primary School.

== Bibliography ==
- Mortimer, William Williams (1847). The History of the Hundred of Wirral. London: Whittaker & Co. pp299-303.
