= James Bindley =

18th/19th-century English official, antiquary, and book collector

James Bindley (1737–1818) was an English official and antiquary, known as a book collector.

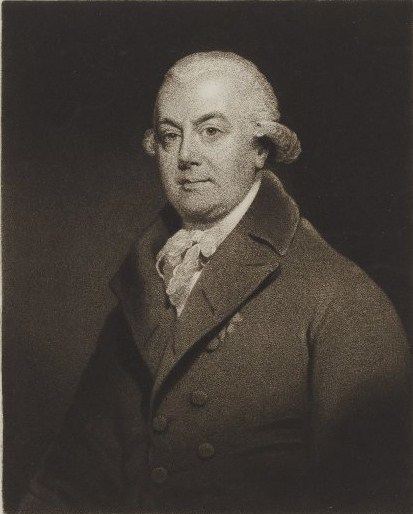
James Bindley, 1819 mezzotint by William Say.

== Life ==
The second son of John Bindley, a distiller, of St. John Street, Smithfield, London, he was born in London on 16 January 1737. He was educated at Charterhouse School under Lewis Crusius, and then went to Peterhouse, Cambridge, where he was elected to a fellowship (B.A. 1759, M.A. 1762).

In 1765 Bindley succeeded his elder brother John Bindley as one of the commissioners of the stamp duties, and in that capacity he served for upwards of fifty-three years. He was the senior commissioner from 1781 until his death, which occurred at his house in Somerset Place on 11 September 1818. A monument to his memory, by Josephus Kendrick, was erected in the church of St. Mary-le-Strand. At his death he was the "father" of the Society of Antiquaries of London, having been elected a fellow in 1765.

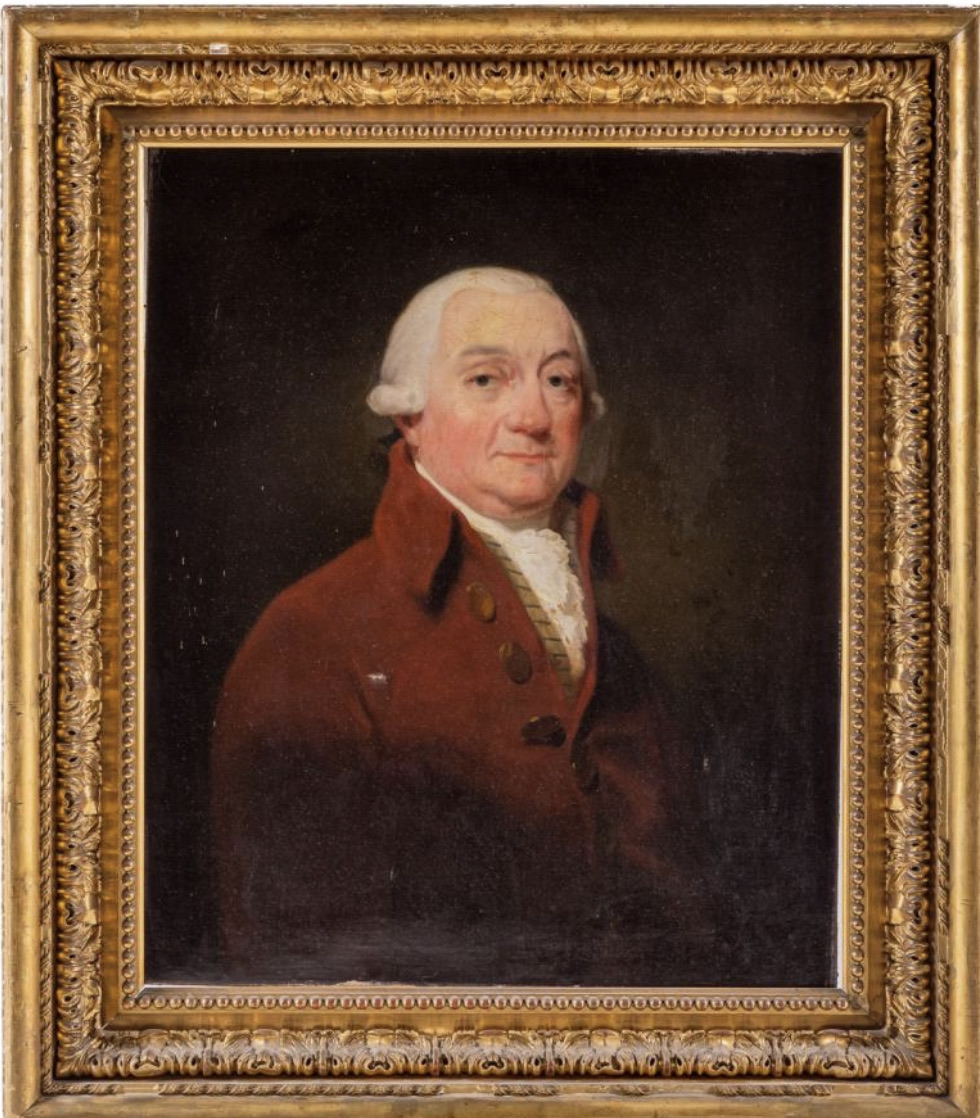
By Gilbert Stuart (1755-1828), ca. 1790

== Collector ==
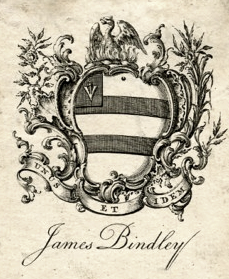
Bookplate of James Bindley

Bindley formed a collection of rare books, engravings, and medals, which were sold by auction after his death. Two series of sales, by Samuel Sotheby and Robert Harding Evans, raised over £20,000.

He read John Nichols's Literary Anecdotes, which are dedicated to him, in proof, and the subsequent Illustrations of the Literary History of the Eighteenth Century, suggesting emendations and adding notes. In the same way he assisted, at close of his life, his friend William Bray, in the publication of Evelyn's Diary.

== Works ==
The only work Bindley published was A Collection of the Statutes now in force relating to the Stamp Duties, London, 1775.

== See also ==
- Lord Baltimore penny
