= Thomas Evans (bookseller, born 1742) =

Thomas Evans (1742–1784) was a London bookseller, one of two of the same name in the middle of the 18th century.

== Life ==
Evans served an apprenticeship with Charles Marsh of Round Court and Charing Cross, and opened a bookshop in the Strand, London. He published works on English literature and antiquities, many edited by himself.

A leading member of the booksellers' club in the Grecian Coffee-house, to which Thomas Davies belonged, Evans was popular. Unlike his namesake Thomas Evans (1739–1803), he was on good terms with Oliver Goldsmith, and collected the first London edition of his writings.

Evans died on 30 April 1784.

== Works ==
Evans wrote or edited:

- Poems by Mr. W. Shakespeare [London, 1774].
- A History of Wales by Caradoc of Lhancarvan. Englished by Dr. Powell, London, 1774.
- Memoirs of the Cardinal de Retz, translated, London, 1774, 4 vols.
- The Works of Richard Savage, London, 1775, 2 vols.
- The Works of George Villiers, Duke of Buckingham, London, 1775, 2 vols.
- The English, Scotch, and Irish Historical Libraries, by Bishop W. Nicolson, a new edition, London, 1776.
- A Solemn Declaration of Mr. Daniel Perreau, written by himself, London, 1776. Daniel Perreau (c.1734–1776) was a forger of bonds, hanged in 1776.
- Desiderata Curiosa, by Francis Peck, new edition, London, 1779, 2 vols. Evans submitted in it a proposal to reprint Thomas Tanner's Notitia Monastica, some years later published by James Nasmith in a new edition.
- Poetical Works of Matthew Prior, London, 1779, 2 vols.
- Poetical and Dramatic Works of O. Goldsmith, London, 1780, 2 vols.
- Old Ballads, Historical and Narrative, with some of Modern Date, now first collected and reprinted from Rare Copies and MSS., with Notes by T. Evans, London, 1784, 2 vols. First edition, 1777, 2 vols.; third edition, edited by R. H. Evans, his son, 1810, 4 vols. This was his major work.
- The Works of Francis Rabelais, translated, London, 1784, 4 vols.

== Family ==
Evans left a widow Ann and a young son, Robert Harding Evans.

== Notes ==
Attribution

This article incorporates text from a publication now in the public domain: Stephen, Leslie, ed. (1889). "Evans, Thomas (1742-1784)". Dictionary of National Biography. Vol. 18. London: Smith, Elder & Co.
