= Central Park, Wallasey =

Public park in Liscard, Wirral, England

Central Park
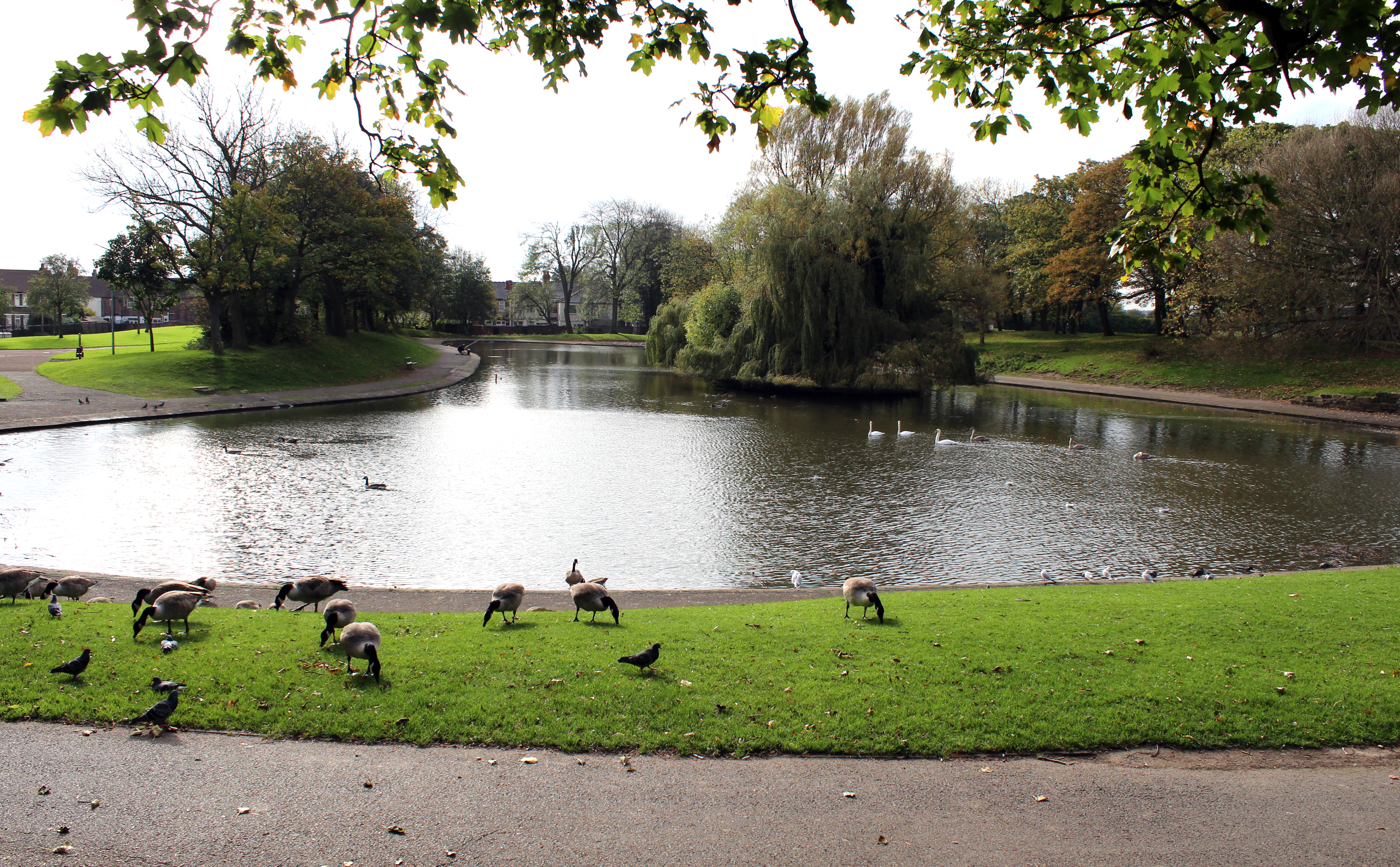
- The lake at Central Park
- Interactive map of Central Park
- Type: Public park
- Location: Wallasey, Merseyside, England
- Coordinates: 53.4149°N 3.0381°W
- Operator: Metropolitan Borough of Wirral
- Open: All year
- Status: Open

Central Park is located in Wallasey, Merseyside, England. The park was the site of Liscard Hall, which was set ablaze by local vandals on 7 July 2008. The damage to the hall was too severe and the once grand house had to be demolished. The hall was the home of Sir John Tobin, a former Mayor of Liverpool.

The park has football and cricket grounds, play areas, a fishing lake and a pump track. The park is home to a war memorial dedicated to those who lost their lives in the Boer War, in the form of a statue of Britannia.
