= Sir John Tobin =

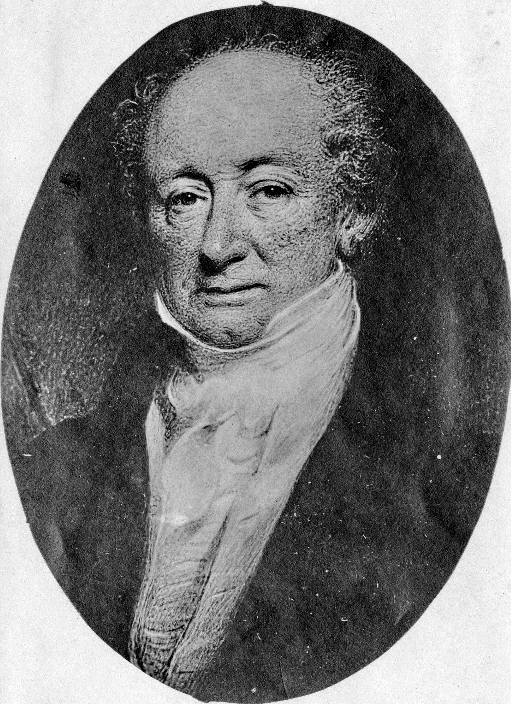
Sir John Tobin

Sir John Tobin (1763–1851) was a Manx merchant based in Liverpool. He was a merchant seaman who became a sea captain, making voyages both as a slave trader and as a privateer against French shipping. He was Mayor of Liverpool in 1819–1820. In later life he was involved in canal and railway development.

== Background ==
He was born into the large family of Patrick Tobin (1735–1794) of Kirkbraddon (Braddan, Isle of Man), a merchant with Irish background, and his wife Helen Breakill; his brother Thomas (1775–1863) was father of Sir Thomas Tobin (1807–1881). His sister Amelia married William Hillary in 1813, as his second wife.

== At sea ==
Tobin went to sea young from Liverpool. By 1793 and the outbreak of the French Revolutionary Wars he was master of the Gipsy or Gipsey, a privateer. Off the Kingdom of Loango, he captured the Hirondelle, a French slaver and its cargo. The prize party took it to Mayumba, on the way capturing the Pourvoyeur with slaves and ivory. After that, the Gipsey with other privateers took another French slaver, the Emilie, and sent it across the Atlantic to Grenada. A further success on this voyage was the capture of an American vessel with supplies for Martinique, which was taken to Jamaica.

In 1798 George Case & Co. made Tobin master of the privateer Molly, and he voyaged to Angola. He took as prize a Spanish ship from Cádiz bound for the River Plate in South America. He returned with Archibald Dalzel as passenger.

== In commerce ==
In 1798 Tobin married into the Aspinall slave-trading family. In 1799 he set up John Tobin & Co., his own slaving company. His brother Thomas was also an associate of the Aspinalls, undertaking slaving voyages from the Kingdom of Bonny to Jamaica. Both later, after the abolition of 1807, were heavily involved in commerce with Africa, particularly as importers of palm oil. In total John Tobin was involved in at least ten slaving voyages, with the Aspinalls, Peter Whitfield Brancker who had also married an Aspinall, John Gladstone and others.

Arthur William Moore in Manx Worthies states that Tobin had an interest in the William Heathcote, and owned the John Tobin, both ships caught up in the Napoleonic War sea actions.

An important figure for Tobin in his business with the Efik states of Old Calabar was Efiom Edem (died 1834), known to Europeans as "Duke Ephraim". He was a slave broker who had moved into a middleman role in the palm oil trade. The blind traveller James Holman reported (26 January 1828) on a brass chair weighing 160 pounds (73 kg) at Duke Town given to Duke Ephraim by Tobin.

== Politics ==
Tobin was a Tory, a supporter of George Canning who was Member of Parliament for Liverpool for a decade from 1812. He was a friend of both Canning and William Huskisson, and connected to the Gladstone family, making him a leading Liverpool Tory. In the 1819 mayoral poll, Tobin defeated the Whig Thomas Leyland (died 1827), a banker who had stood unsuccessfully for parliament in 1816.

== Later life ==
Tobin was knighted in 1820, on the accession of George IV of the United Kingdom. In 1822 he was on the provisional board that founded the Liverpool and Manchester Railway in 1824, with Joseph Sandars, John Gladstone, William Ewart (1763–1823) and others. He was subsequently on the Liverpool common council. He received compensation for slaves on two Jamaican estates after emancipation.

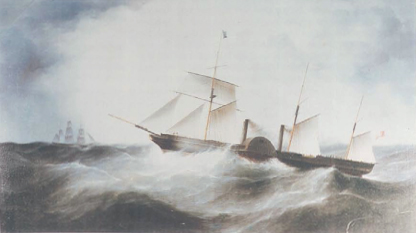
SS Liverpool, painting c.1840

In 1837, the SS Liverpool, a steamer commissioned by Tobin to cross the Atlantic, was launched. He retired from his African trading business soon after 1840. He died at Liscard Hall on 27 February 1851, and was buried nearby at St John's Church in Wallasey.

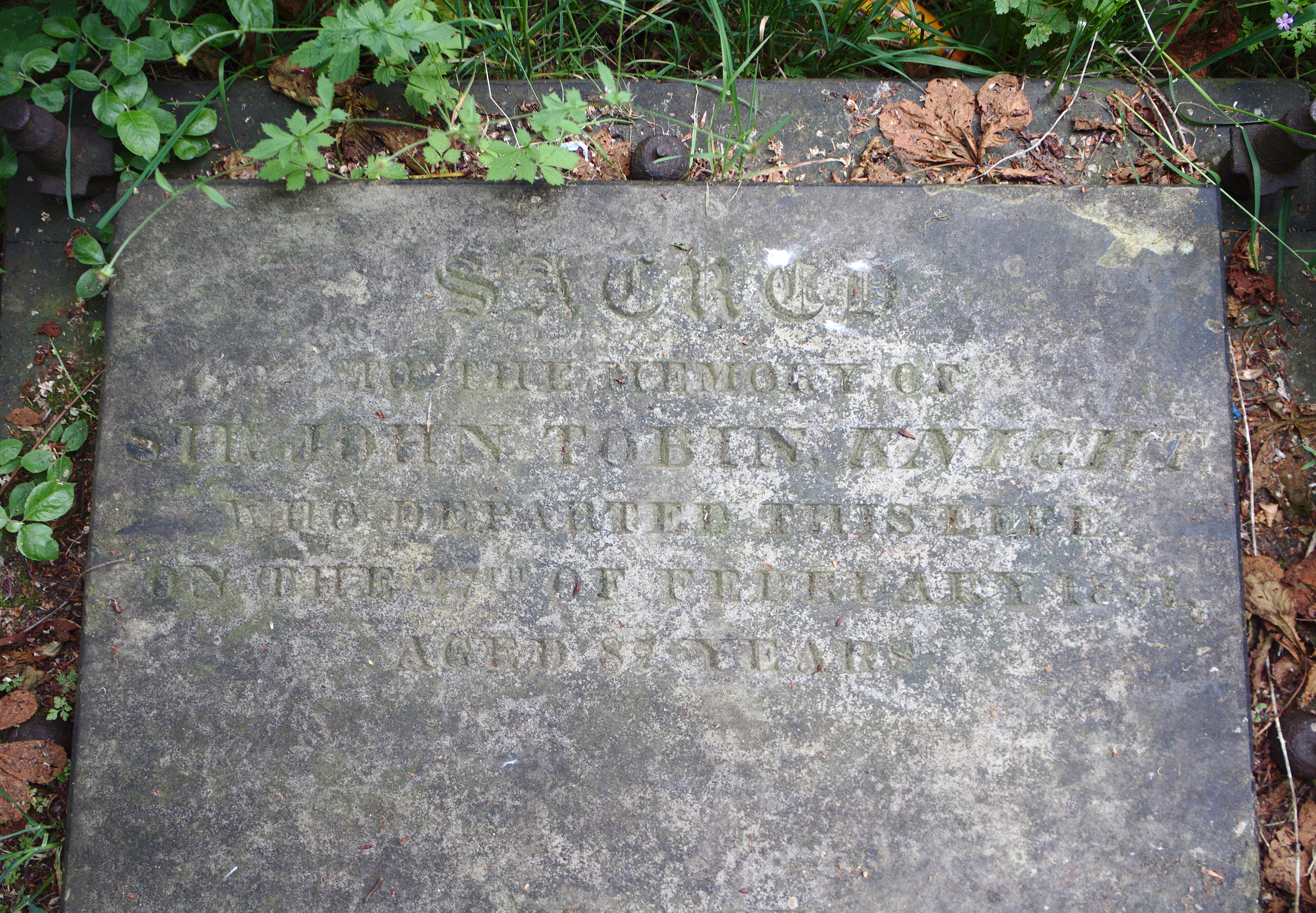
Tomb of Sir John Tobin, at St John's Church, Wallasey

== Liscard Hall ==
Tobin in 1835 purchased Liscard Hall on the Wirral Peninsula, Cheshire, over the Mersey from Liverpool. He had first bought property in Wallasey in 1802, from the Egerton family. The Hall was part of the old land of Birkenhead Priory: Tobin acquired it from Francis Richard Price, in 1834–5 High Sheriff of Denbighshire. The initial name was "Moor Heys House".

== Collector ==
Tobin was known as a collector of illuminated manuscripts. He possessed an outstanding example, the Bedford Hours.

Tobin acquired the Bedford Hours (known also as the Bedford Missal) from John Milner. In fact, however, the circumstances are unclear. It belonged to George Spencer-Churchill, 5th Duke of Marlborough, a bibliophile who by 1819 was deeply in debt. It was supposed to be part of his Whiteknights library, put up for auction by Robert Harding Evans in October of that year. In a letter to William Elford in November, Miss Mitford relayed a story of the Duke having abstracted the manuscript from its locked case. The diarist Harriet Arbuthnot concluded from this affair, and the melting of gold plate at Blenheim Palace, that the Duke was "little better than a common swindler". According to the British Library provenance, the manuscript came to Milner as security for a loan he made to the Duke. Tobin then bought it at another auction by Evans in 1833, paying £1100. Bidding against Tobin was John Soane, who had not long before bought at auction the Isabella Breviary, against bidding from Tobin's agent John Cochran; and then sold it to Tobin at a marked up price of £645. Tobin also owned the "Hours of Joanna the Mad" (British Library Add MS 18852, rather than The Hours of Joanna I of Castile which is Add MS 35313), bought also in 1833, but from the collection of Philip Augustus Hanrott.

The Bedford Hours was given by Tobin to his son, the Rev. John Tobin. It went then to William Boone, a London bookseller; and was ultimately bought for the British Museum. It is now in the British Library.

Tobin also owned a noted painting by Giovanni Antonio Canaletto of Eton College, now in the National Gallery, London, which passed there with the Wynn Ellis bequest.

== Family ==
Tobin married in 1798 Sarah Aspinall, daughter of James Aspinall (1729–1787). Their sons included the Rev. John Tobin (1809–1874). Their daughter Sarah (1803–1875) married John Ready as his second wife.

John Bridge Aspinall (1759–1830) who was Tobin's business partner was Sarah's brother; and father of the Rev. James Aspinall.
