= Janet Backhouse =

English manuscripts curator (1938–2004)

- Born: 8 February 1938; Corsham, Wiltshire, UK
- Died: 3 November 2004 (aged 66); Bath, Somerset, UK
- Occupation: Curator of manuscripts

Janet Moira Backhouse (8 February 1938 – 3 November 2004) was an English manuscripts curator at the British Museum, and a leading authority in the field of illuminated manuscripts.

== Early life and education ==
Janet Backhouse was born in Corsham, Wiltshire, the daughter of Joseph Holme Backhouse and Jessie Chivers Backhouse. Her father was a cattle-feed salesman. Her brother David John Backhouse became a sculptor and author.

Backhouse was educated at Stonar School and Bedford College, London. At Bedford she worked with Lillian Penson and with paleographer Francis Wormald.

== Career ==
In 1962 Backhouse joined the British Museum's Manuscripts department as an Assistant Keeper of Western Manuscripts. In that role, she catalogued the papers of horsewoman Lady Anne Blunt, accompanied a manuscript of Tsar Ivan Alexander to Bulgaria in 1977, and escorted the Lindisfarne Gospels to be exhibited at Durham Cathedral in 1987, to mark the 1300th anniversary of the death of Cuthbert. She also co-organised with Leslie Webster a 1991 exhibition of Anglo-Saxon artifacts and manuscripts, at the British Museum.

Backhouse was a longstanding member of the council of the Henry Bradshaw Society, a fellow of the Society of Antiquaries, and served as an advisor to the National Art Collections Fund. She was elected a member of the Comité International de Paléographie Latine in 1993. She edited the proceedings of the Harlaxton Medieval Symposium in 1998. She retired from the British Library (as it had since become) as Curator of Illuminated Manuscripts in 1998. By the end of her career "she had established an international reputation as one of the foremost scholars in her field".

Backhouse died in 2004 from cancer, aged 66 years, in Bath, Somerset. She contributed to A Masterpiece Reconstructed: The Hours of Louis XII (2005), which was published after her death. A festschrift, Illuminating the Book: Makers and Interpreters: Essays in Honour of Janet Backhouse, was published on the occasion of her retirement, edited by Michelle P. Brown and Scot McKendrick (1998).

== Select bibliography ==
- The Illuminated Manuscript (1979)
- The Lindisfarne Gospels (1981) – on the Lindisfarne Gospels
- Books of Hours (1985)
- The Becket Leaves (1988)
- The Luttrell Psalter (1989) – on the Luttrell Psalter
- The Bedford Hours (1990) – on the Bedford Hours
- The Isabella Breviary (1993) – on the Isabella Breviary
- The Illuminated Page: Ten Centuries of Manuscript Painting in the British Library (1997)
- The Hastings Hours (1997)
- The Sherborne Missal (1999) – on the Sherborne Missal
- Medieval Rural Life in the Luttrell Psalter (2000)
- Medieval Birds in the Sherborne Missal (2001)
- Illumination from Books of Hours (2004)
