= Liscard Hall =

Mansion house in Wallasey, demolished 2008

Coordinates: 53°24′58″N 3°02′12″W

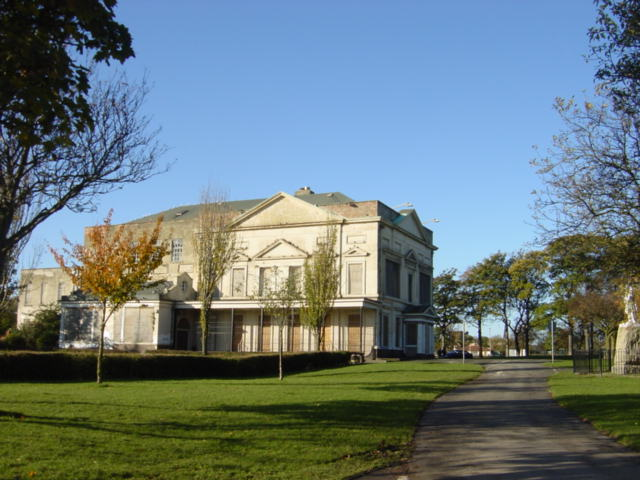
- Liscard Hall in 2005
- Interactive map of the Liscard Hall area

General information
- Location: Wallasey, Wirral, England
- Completed: 1832
- Demolished: 2008

Design and construction
- Architect: Sir John Tobin

Liscard Hall was a 19th-century Grade II listed mansion located in Wallasey, Merseyside, England. Formerly known as Moors Hey House, the building was constructed in 1832 for Sir John Tobin, a former slave-ship captain, on an estate occupying 57 acres (23 ha) of land.

After Tobin's death in 1851, it was inherited by his son-in-law Harold Littledale, a Liverpool merchant, who lived there until his own death in 1889. The estate was bought by the Wallasey Local Board, who turned the grounds into Central Park, and the house was used as the Wallasey School of Art, later renamed the Liscard Science and Art College. The college moved out in the 1980s, and the building was taken over by Serve Wirral Training, which managed the local Youth Training Scheme until it closed in 2003.

The building was owned by Wirral Council but remained empty. In 2008 vandals set the disused building on fire, resulting in its subsequent demolition after being deemed unsafe.
