= Robert Harding Evans =

English bookseller and auctioneer

Robert Harding Evans (1778–1857) was an English bookseller and auctioneer.

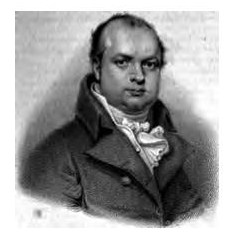
Robert Harding Evans, engraving by Samuel Freeman after William Behnes.

== Life ==
Evans was the son of Thomas Evans (1742–1784). After an education at Westminster School he was apprenticed to Thomas Payne of the Mews Gate, and succeeded to the business of James Edwards, bookseller in Pall Mall, London.

In 1812 Evans began a long career as auctioneer with the sale of the Duke of Roxburghe's library. Among other famous libraries dispersed by him were those of:

- Colonel Stanley (1813);
- Stanesby Alchorne (1813);
- John Towneley (1814); and
- James Edwards (1815).

Other sales were of:

- the Duke of Devonshire's duplicates (1815);
- the Duke of Grafton's library (1815);
- the vellum-printed books of Field-marshal Junot (1816); and
- the Borromeo collection of novels and romances (1817).
- General Francisco de Miranda (1828 & 1833)

He also sold the White Knights library (of George Spencer-Churchill, 5th Duke of Marlborough), those of James Bindley, John Dent, George Hibbert, Dudley Long North, and some portions of Richard Heber's (1836).

Evans's own marked set of catalogues went to the British Museum, and between 1812 and 1847 the chief libraries sold in England went through his hands. He was in the habit of discoursing upon the books passing under his hammer; but his expertise as an auctioneer was not matched by ordinary business qualities, and he fell into money troubles. When re-established as a bookseller in Bond Street, in partnership with his two sons, he was again unsuccessful.

Evans died in Edward Street, Hampstead Road, London, on 25 April 1857, in his eightieth year. His widow, Susanna, died in Stamford Road, Fulham, on 31 January 1861, aged 80.

== Works ==
Some works bear Evans's imprint as publisher. The following were written or edited by him:

- Bishop Burnet's History of his own Time, London, 1809, 4 vols.
- Hakluyt's Collection of the Early Voyages, Travels, and Discoveries of the English Nation. A new edition, with additions, London, 1809–12, 5 vols. (part of the fourth volume and the whole of the fifth are added in this edition).
- Essays on Song-writing, with a Collection of such English Songs as are most eminent for Poetical Merit. By John Aikin. A new edition, with additions and corrections, and a Supplement, London, 1810.
- Old Ballads, by Thomas Evans. A new edition revised and considerably enlarged from Public and Private Collections, by his Son, London, 1810, 4 vols.
- Euripidis Opera, Gr. et Lat., Glasgow, 1821, 9 vols. (Evans helped Andrew and John Morison Duncan in preparing this edition).
- Historical and Descriptive Account of the Caricatures of James Gillray, London, 1851, (written with Thomas Wright).

Two political works are now attributed to Robert Harding Evans (1784–1821), who edited parliamentary reports:

- Six Letters of Publicola on the Liberty of the Subject and the Privileges of the House of Commons, originally published in the "Times", now collected and illustrated, London, 1810 (anonymous);
- A Letter on the Expediency of a Reform in Parliament, addressed to Lord Erskine, London, 1817.
