= Benning (surname) =

Benning is a surname or, less frequently, a forename.

== People whose surname is Benning ==
- Achim Benning (1935–2024), German actor and director
- Anton Benning (1918–2013), German World War II flying ace
- Brian Benning (born 1966), retired Canadian ice hockey player
- Christine Benning (born 1955), English middle-distance runner
- Clement Pitt Benning (1785–1865), Canadian merchant and magistrate
- Dave Benning (born 1969), retired Canadian soccer player and coach
- Denise Benning (born 1967), former Canadian figure skater
- Frank Benning (1907–1990), Australian rugby league player and administrator
- Fred G. Benning (1900–1974), American soldier and public servant
- Henry Arthur Benning (1879–1962), American vice-president and general manager of the Amalgamated Sugar Company
- Henry L. Benning (1814–1875), Confederate general, lawyer and legislator
- James Benning (cricketer) (born 1983), English cricketer
- James Benning (film director) (born 1942), American film director
- Jim Benning (born 1963), retired Canadian ice hockey player
- Joe Benning (born 1956), American politician
- Mal Benning (born 1993), English footballer
- Mark Benning (born 1964), Canadian ice hockey player
- Matt Benning (born 1994), Canadian ice hockey player
- Micky Benning (1938–2019), English footballer
- Norm Benning (born 1952), American NASCAR owner/driver
- Osla Benning (1921–1974), Canadian debutante who worked at Bletchley Park
- Sadie Benning (born 1973), American musician and visual artist
- Sheri Benning, Canadian writer from Saskatchewan, Canada
- Sybille Benning (1961–2022), German politician

== People whose forename is Benning ==
- Benning M. Bean (1782–1866), American farmer and politician
- Benning W. Jenness (1806–1879), American politician
- Benning Potoa'e (born 1996), American football player
- Benning Wentworth (1696–1770), British politician

== See also ==
- Bening
- Benningen
- Brenning
