= Hours of Joanna I of Castile =

Sixteenth-century illuminated codex

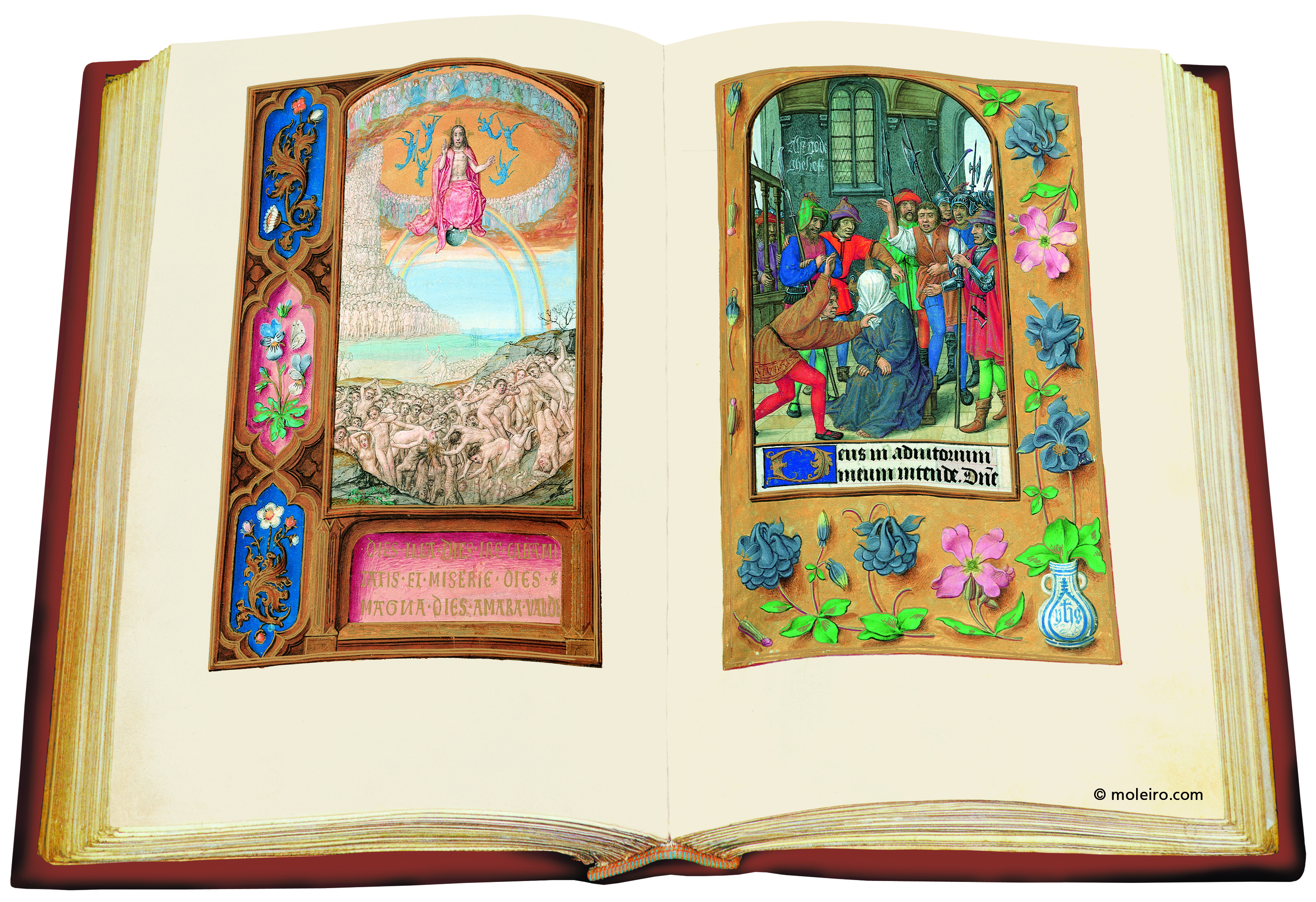
Hours of Joana I of Castile (British Library, Add MS 35313)

The Hours of Joanna I of Castile is a sixteenth-century illuminated codex housed in the British Library, London, under call number Add MS 35313.

== Authors ==
The miniatures are the work of Gerard Horenbout, the greatest Flemish miniaturist of the 16th century, and Sanders Bening and his workshop, who painted most of the portraits in the Suffrages of the Saints. The authorship of these two ateliers suggests that the manuscript was made in the city of Ghent.

Gerard Horenbout and his atelier painted 38 of the manuscript’s miniatures and possibly the calendar too. Horenbout is the surname of a family of artists from Ghent from the 15th – 17th centuries. Gerard was admitted to the Ghent painters’ guild as a master in 1487 and in 1515 was appointed court painter and valet to Margaret of Austria. Bering and his atelier produced another 37 miniatures including 24 half-page illuminations. Although little documentary evidence about his work has survived, he is known to have been admitted to the SS. Luke and John Painters’ and Sculptors’ Guild of Ghent in 1463, and that he lived in Ghent and visited Bruges regularly to sell his paintings.

== Description and contents ==
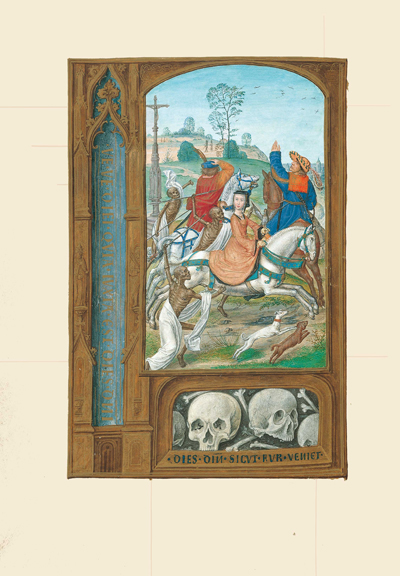
Hours of Joanna I of Castile f 158v.

Noteworthy features of these miniatures are their three-dimensional realism and great sophistication, particularly those in the Passion cycle. The faces charged with emotion and the lively realism of the illuminated scenes make this manuscript one of the most outstanding works of Flemish art.

=== Calendar ===
The layout of the calendar pages in the Hours of Joanna I of Castile consists of a series of images around the text of each month, where the letters KL (calendas) can be seen (as in most medieval manuscript calendars) and also a set of columns of numbers, letters and text. This calendar highlights important feasts by writing the saint’s name in red ink and minor feasts in black. Each folio in the calendar shows one month and features the architectural frame and medallions typical of the Ghent-Bruges school. Depicted along the bottom, as usual in books of hours, is an activity typical of the month in question.

=== Hours of the Cross and of the Virgin ===
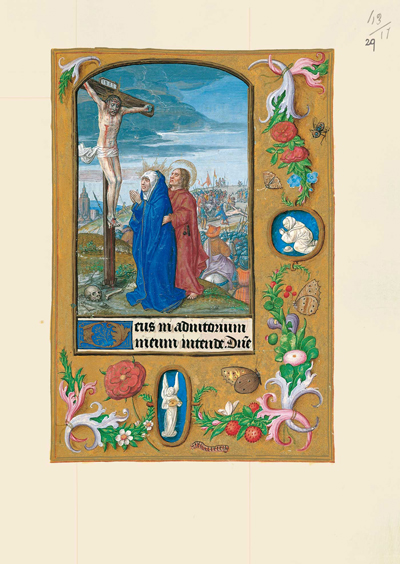
Hours of Joanna I of Castile f. 29r

The most innovative parts of the manuscript are lavishly illuminated and found in two different iconographic cycles: the Hours of the Cross and the Hours of the Virgin. The Hours of the Cross contain fourteen miniatures arranged in pairs which depict the Passion of Christ from the entrance into Jerusalem to the holy burial. The Hours of the Virgin contain eight pairs of miniatures, most of which feature an episode from Our Lady’s life from the Annunciation to the Crowning, together with the occasional related episode from the Old Testament. The manuscript’s finest miniatures are to be found in these two cycles, in which the artist reduces the text inserts to a minimum, sometimes just two lines, to leave as much room as possible for the illumination. The uniform style of the margins helps give these insertions a seamless, visual continuity.

=== Ownership ===
The Office of the Dead features a version of a rather unusual composition to be found in the Hours of Mary of Burgundy, Berlin showing Mary on horseback in the legend of the three living and three dead creatures. This miniature may well suggest that that book was commissioned for a woman or for someone closely related to the Duchess of Burgundy.

The lavishness of the manuscript indicates that it was commissioned by a monarch. The presence of St Celedonius, St Ildephonsus and St Isidore suggest that the codex was made for a member of Spanish royalty, possibly Joanna the Mad, Queen of Castile, judging by the references to St John the Baptist, St John the Evangelist and St Isidore.

In the mid-nineteenth century, the codex belonged to the collection of Ferdinand James Anselm de Rothschild (1839–1898), Baron de Rothschild, whose family also owned the Rothschild Prayerbook, which was also painted by Gerard Horenbout. The Baron bequeathed the Hours of Joanna I of Castile to the British Museum in 1898.

The Spanish publisher M. Moleiro Editor published the first and only facsimile edition of the Hours of Joanna I of Castile in a limited edition of 987 with a companion volume featuring studies by Carlos Miranda García-Tejedor.
