= Benning =

Benning may refer to:

== People ==
- Benning Wentworth, governor of New Hampshire under kings George II and George III
- Benning (surname)

== Places ==
- Benning, Minnesota, an unincorporated community
- Benning, Washington, D.C., a residential neighborhood in northeast Washington D.C.
  - Benning Heights, Washington, D.C.
  - Benning Ridge, Washington, D.C.
  - Benning Road station, a Metro station in Washington
  - Benning Race Track, a horse racing venue that opened in 1890 in Washington
- Benning National Forest, a National Forest in Georgia, United States
- Fort Benning, a U.S. Army post in Georgia
- Fort Benning South, a former census-designated place in Georgia, now part of the consolidated city of Cusseta

== Other things ==
- Benning Violins, a firm in Studio City, California
- Norm Benning Racing, a stock-car team

== See also ==
- Bening (disambiguation)
- Binning (disambiguation)
