= DA 193 =

Blazar in the constellation Auriga

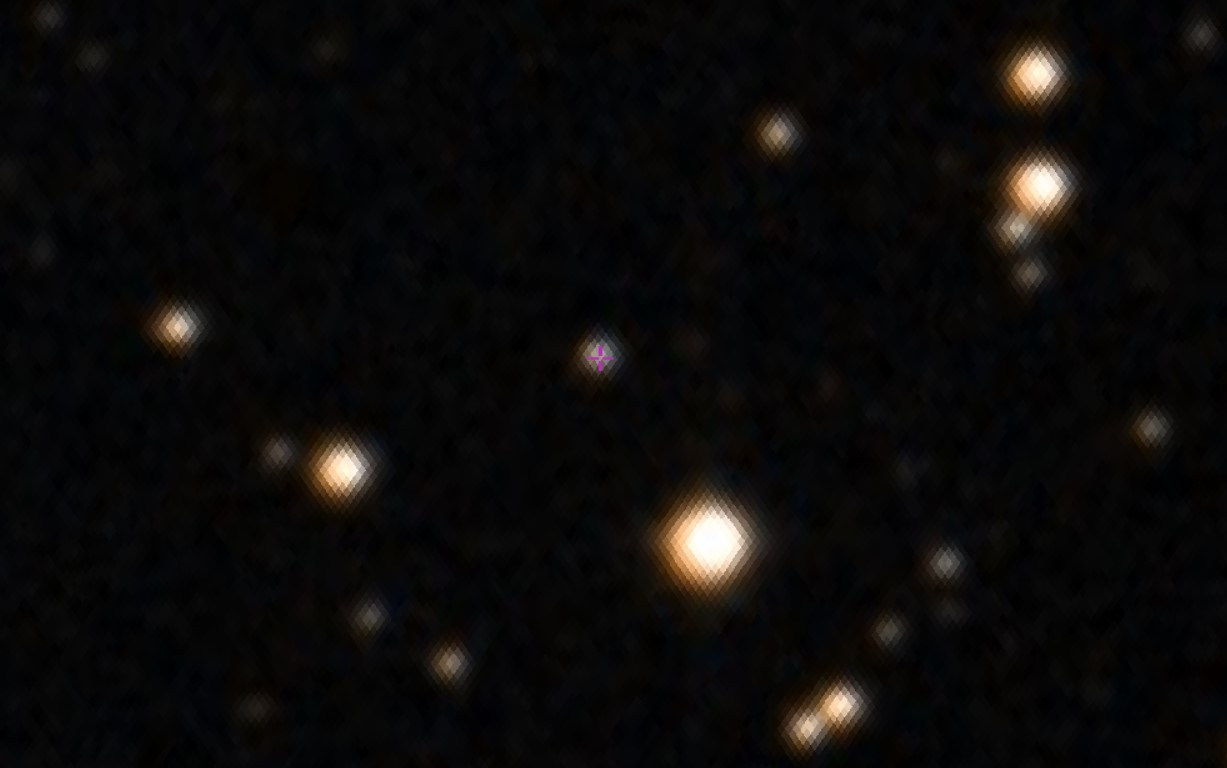
- The blazar DA 193

Observation data (J2000.0 epoch)
- Constellation: Auriga
- Right ascension: 05^{h} 55^{m} 30.805^{s}
- Declination: +39° 48′ 49.165″
- Redshift: 2.365000
- Heliocentric radial velocity: 709,009 km/s
- Distance: 10.545 Gly
- Apparent magnitude (V): 18.3

Characteristics
- Type: Blazar

Other designations
- SWIFT J0555.5+3946, WMAP 100, TXS 0552+398, 2XMM J055530.7+394848

DA 193 is a blazar located in the constellation of Auriga. It has a high redshift of 2.365. It was first discovered as an unknown astronomical radio source in 1971 by D.G. MacDonell and A.H. Bridle. This is a low polarized quasar containing a classic homogeneous synchrotron self-absorption spectrum. The radio spectrum of this source shows a turnover frequency at 5 GHz and this object has also been referred to as a gigahertz-peak spectrum source.

DA 193 is found variable on the electromagnetic spectrum. It is bright in X-rays and displays a flat X-ray spectrum that is above 10 keV. During the first week of January 2018, it underwent a giga-electron volt (GeV) flare which was detected by Fermi-LAT. This GeV flare exhibited from DA 193 showed an exceeded binned gamma ray flux (1 × 10^{−6} ph cm^{−2} s^{−1}) and was found to be extremely luminous (Lγ = (1.3 ± 0.4) × 10^{50} erg s^{−1}). When observing its hard gamma-ray spectrum, the flare in DA 193 was confirmed to be a rare sight. In the optical-X-ray energy range, it shows an insignificant flux meaning its source went back to its quiescence state.

DA 193 contains one of the most compact radio sources known on both millisecond and arcsecond scales. In its radio structure, there are four components in the core region with the suggestion of a weak component located 2.3 mas. There is presence of a short jet extending towards the western direction. Furthermore, DA 193 has a simple core-halo structure according to VLBI Observations, with the major axis of the halo having a 110° position angle. This halo's position angle is found alike to the linear polarization position angle.

The central supermassive black hole of DA 193 is estimated to be (5.5 ± 0.9) × 10^{9} M_{☉} based on calculations of a single optical spectroscopic emission line information, derived from usage of C IV emission lines and acquiring empirical relations proposed by Yue Shen. Its accretion disk luminosity is estimated as (1.3 ± 0.1) × 10^{47} erg s^{−1}.

DA 193 has one close companion 2.9" to the north. The companion is found connected to the quasar via tidal interactions. Both objects are situated in a dense compact galaxy group.
