= Grouped data =

Organized raw data that has not been otherwise processed or transformed

Grouped data are data formed by aggregating individual observations of a variable into groups, so that a frequency distribution of these groups serves as a convenient means of summarizing or analyzing the data. There are two major types of grouping: data binning of a single-dimensional variable, replacing individual numbers by counts in bins; and grouping multi-dimensional variables by some of the dimensions (especially by independent variables), obtaining the distribution of ungrouped dimensions (especially the dependent variables).

== Example ==
The idea of grouped data can be illustrated by considering the following raw dataset:

Table 1: Time taken (in seconds) by a group of students to answer a simple math question
20	25	24	33	13	26	8	19	31	11	16	21	17	11	34	14	15	21	18	17

The above data can be grouped in order to construct a frequency distribution in any of several ways. One method is to use intervals as a basis.

The smallest value in the above data is 8 and the largest is 34, while the sample mean amounts to 19.7 seconds. The interval from 8 to 34 is broken up into smaller subintervals (called class intervals). For each class interval, the number of data items falling in this interval is counted. This number is called the frequency of that class interval. The results are tabulated as a frequency table as follows:

Table 2: Frequency distribution of the time taken (in seconds) by the group of students to answer a simple math question
Time taken (in seconds)	Frequency
5 ≤ t < 10	1
10 ≤ t < 15	4
15 ≤ t < 20	6
20 ≤ t < 25	4
25 ≤ t < 30	2
30 ≤ t < 35	3

Another method of grouping the data is to use some qualitative characteristics instead of numerical intervals. For example, suppose in the above example, there are three types of students: 1) Below normal, if the response time is 5 to 14 seconds, 2) normal if it is between 15 and 24 seconds, and 3) above normal if it is 25 seconds or more, then the grouped data looks like:

Table 3: Frequency distribution of the three types of students
	Frequency
Below normal	5
Normal	10
Above normal	5

Yet another example of grouping the data is the use of some commonly used numerical values, which are in fact "names" we assign to the categories. For example, let us look at the age distribution of the students in a class. The students may be 10 years old, 11 years old or 12 years old. These are the age groups, 10, 11, and 12. Note that the students in age group 10 are from 10 years and 0 days, to 10 years and 364 days old, and their average age is 10.5 years old if we look at age in a continuous scale. The grouped data looks like:

Table 4: Age distribution of a class of students
Age	Frequency
10	10
11	20
12	10

== Mean of grouped data ==
An estimate, $\bar{x}$, of the mean of the population from which the data are drawn can be calculated from the grouped data as:

$$\bar{x}=\frac{\sum{f\,x}}{\sum{f}} .$$

In this formula, x refers to the midpoint of the class intervals, and f is the class frequency. Note that the result of this will be different from the sample mean of the ungrouped data. The mean for the grouped data in the above example, can be calculated as follows:

Class Intervals	Frequency ( f )	Midpoint ( x )	f x
5 and above, below 10	1	7.5	7.5
10 ≤ t < 15	4	12.5	50
15 ≤ t < 20	6	17.5	105
20 ≤ t < 25	4	22.5	90
25 ≤ t < 30	2	27.5	55
30 ≤ t < 35	3	32.5	97.5
TOTAL	20		405

Thus, the mean of the grouped data is

$$\bar{x}=\frac{\sum{f\,x}}{\sum{f}} = \frac{405}{20} = 20.25$$

The mean for the grouped data in example 4 above can be calculated as follows:

Age Group	Frequency ( f )	Midpoint ( x )	f x
10	10	10.5	105
11	20	11.5	230
12	10	12.5	125
TOTAL	40		460

Thus, the mean of the grouped data is

$$\bar{x}=\frac{\sum{f\,x}}{\sum{f}} = \frac{460}{40} = 11.5$$

== See also ==
- Aggregate data
- Censoring (statistics)
- Data binning
- Partition of a set
- Level of measurement
- Frequency distribution
- Discretization of continuous features
- Logistic regression § Minimum chi-squared estimator for grouped data
