= Bening =

Bening is a surname. Notable people with the surname include:

- Ahmed Bening, Ghanaian youth and a social commentator
- Alexander Bening (died 1519), Flemish 16th century miniature painter of the Ghent-Bruges school
- Annette Bening (born 1958), American actress
- Levina Bening (1510–1576), Flemish Renaissance miniaturist to the English court of Henry VIII, Edward VI, Mary I and Elizabeth I
- Simon Bening (1483–1561), Flemish 16th century miniature painter of the Ghent-Bruges school
- Vladimir Bening (born 1954), Russian mathematician

== See also ==
- Benning (disambiguation)
- Binning (disambiguation)
