= Binning =

Binning may refer to:

== People ==
- Binning (surname)
- William of Binning, 13th century Cistercian monk and abbott
- Lord Binning is a subsidiary title of the Earls of Haddington; holders include:
  - Charles Hamilton, Lord Binning, (1697–1732), Scottish politician
  - George Baillie-Hamilton, Lord Binning, (1856–1917), British Army officer

== In science ==
Binning is often used as a synonym to grouping or classification.

- Data binning: a data pre-processing technique.
- Binning (metagenomics): the process of classifying reads into different groups or taxonomies.
- Product binning: in semiconductor device fabrication, the process of categorizing finished products.
- Pixel binning: the process of combining charge from adjacent pixels in a CCD image sensor during readout.

== See also ==
- Bening (disambiguation)
- Benning (disambiguation)
