= Brenning =

Brenning is a surname. Notable people with the surname include:

- Bob Brenning (1932–1959), Australian rugby league player
- Tomas Brenning (born 1967), Swedish bridge player, journalist, and computer programmer
