= Ghent–Bruges school =

School of manuscript illumination in the Southern Netherlands

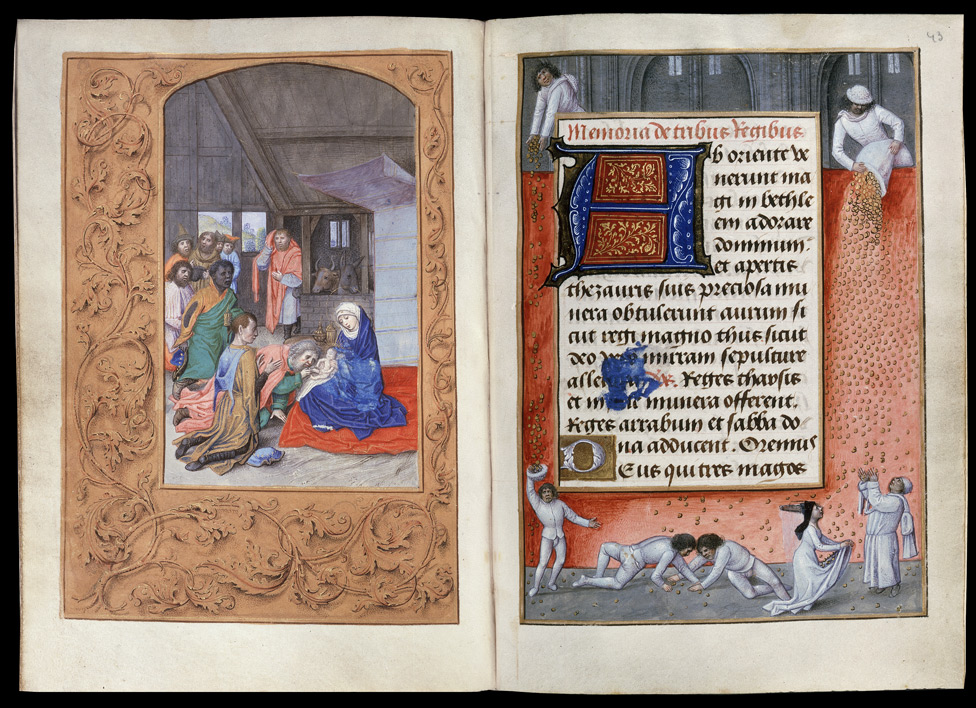
Alexander Bening, Adoration of the Magi, before 1483, British Library

The Ghent–Bruges school is a distinctive style of manuscript illumination which was prevalent in the Southern Netherlands (mainly present-day Belgium) from about 1475 to about 1550, by which point the long tradition of manuscript miniature painting was virtually extinct, displaced by the printed book. Though the name highlights the importance of Ghent and Bruges as centres for manuscript production, manuscripts in the style were produced in a wider area.

== Background ==
The term was first used in 1891 by Belgian art historian Joseph Destrée, in his article Recherches sur les elumineurs flamands, and later the same year by French art historian Paul Durrieu; later it was used by German art historian Friedrich Winkler in his overview of Flemish illuminated manuscripts from the 15th and 16th centuries. Janet Backhouse has described the Ghent–Bruges school as "one of the last great styles of illumination."

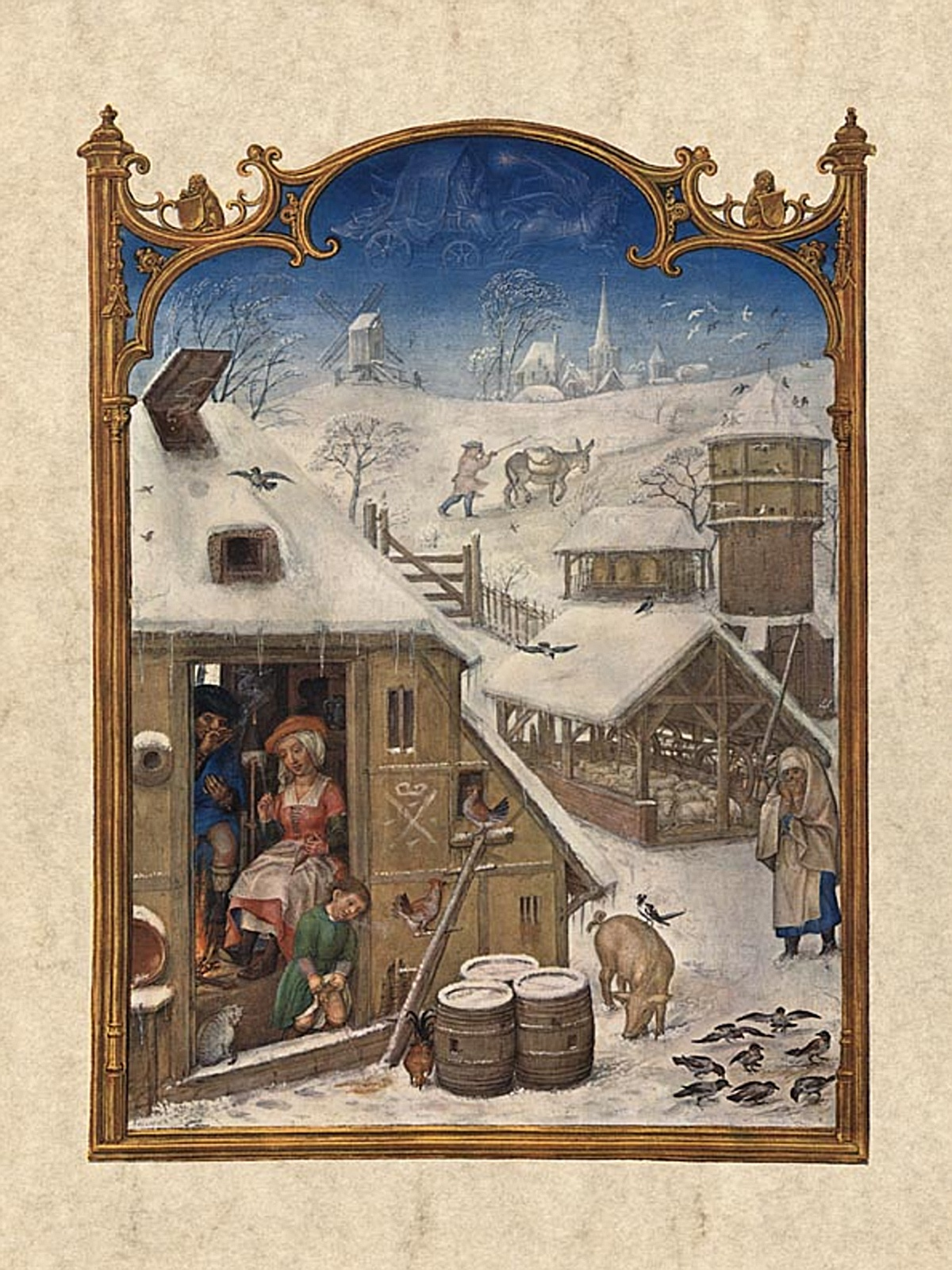
Flemish miniature (1510) with a realistic family at the foreground and a farmer and donkey going to the wind mill (at the back), (Breviarium Grimaldi - 1510).

== Style ==
The style developed around the mid-1470s to the 1480s through a break with the earlier, "courtly style" of about 1440 to 1474 which is closely associated with the aristocratic book collection of the Dukes of Burgundy Philip the Good and Charles the Bold. The patronage of Charles continued to play an important role, but the depiction of human figures in the miniatures went from "wooden, clumsily painted stock-figures" to realistic and increasingly large representations of people, eventually developing into half- or full-length portraits. Simultaneously, but probably unrelatedly, the border decoration of the manuscripts developed towards greater realism and came to occupy a larger part of the page. Both in the miniatures and the border decoration, artists displayed a "concern with verisimilitude" and the use of shaded, pastel colors.

== Criticism ==
The term has been criticised for diverting attention too much to the cities of Ghent and Bruges at a time when manuscript production often was an international or regional undertaking with craftsmen operating in many different urban centres and often collaborating on the same projects.

Christopher de Hamel has on the other hand pointed out that while manuscripts produced in both cities during this time were stylistically similar, illuminators rarely moved between them and they served different markets. Book production in Ghent, at the time the administrative capital of the region, was oriented towards a domestic, Flemish market while manuscripts made in Bruges were intended mainly for international export.

== Notable artists ==
- Alexander Bening
- Simon Bening
- Gerard Horenbout
- Lucas Horenbout
- Susanna Hornebolt
- Jan Provoost
- Levina Teerlinc
- Master of the Flemish Boethius

== Notable examples ==
- Book of Hours of Boussu
- The Hours of Joanna I of Castile
- Mayer van den Bergh Breviary
- Rothschild Prayerbook

== See also ==
- Artists of the Tudor court
- Johannes Crabbe
- Raphael de Mercatellis

== Sources cited ==
- Backhouse, Janet (1979). The Illuminated Manuscript. Oxford: Phaidon Press. ISBN 9780714819693.
- Campbell, Gordon, ed. (2009). The Grove Encyclopedia of Northern Renaissance Art. Vol. 2. Oxford: Oxford University Press. ISBN 978-0-19-533466-1.
- de Hamel, Christopher (2022). The Posthumous Papers of the Manuscript Club. Allen Lane. ISBN 978-0-241-30437-2.
- Kren, Thomas; McKendrick, Scot, eds. (2003). Illuminating the Renaissance: The Triumph of Flemish Manuscript Painting in Europe. Los Angeles: Getty Publications. ISBN 0-89236-703-2.
