= Data binning =

Data pre-processing technique

Data binning, also called data discrete binning or data bucketing, is a data pre-processing technique used to reduce the effects of minor observation errors. The original data values which fall into a given small interval, a bin, are replaced by a value representative of that interval, often a central value (mean or median). It is related to quantization: data binning operates on the abscissa axis while quantization operates on the ordinate axis. Binning is a generalization of rounding.

Statistical data binning is a way to group numbers of more-or-less continuous values into a smaller number of "bins". For example, if you have data about a group of people, you might want to arrange their ages into a smaller number of age intervals (for example, grouping every five years together). It can also be used in multivariate statistics, binning in several dimensions at once.

In digital image processing, "binning" has a very different meaning. Pixel binning is the process of combining blocks of adjacent pixels throughout an image, by summing or averaging their values, during or after readout. It reduces the amount of data; also the relative noise level in the result is lower.

== Example usage ==
Histograms are an example of data binning used in order to observe underlying frequency distributions. They typically occur in one-dimensional space and in equal intervals for ease of visualization.

Data binning may be used when small instrumental shifts in the spectral dimension from mass spectrometry (MS) or nuclear magnetic resonance (NMR) experiments will be falsely interpreted as representing different components, when a collection of data profiles is subjected to pattern recognition analysis. A straightforward way to cope with this problem is by using binning techniques in which the spectrum is reduced in resolution to a sufficient degree to ensure that a given peak remains in its bin despite small spectral shifts between analyses. For example, in NMR the chemical shift axis may be discretized and coarsely binned, and in MS the spectral accuracies may be rounded to an integer multiple of the dalton. Also, several digital camera systems incorporate an automatic pixel binning function to improve image contrast.

Binning is also used in machine learning to speed up the decision-tree boosting method for supervised classification and regression in algorithms such as Microsoft's LightGBM and scikit-learn's Histogram-based Gradient Boosting Classification Tree.

== See also ==
- Binning (disambiguation)
- Censoring (statistics)
- Discretization of continuous features
- Grouped data
- Histogram
- Level of measurement
- Quantization (signal processing)
- Rounding
