= Sheri Benning =

Canadian poet and writer

Sheri Benning is a Canadian writer from Saskatchewan, Canada. Her two books of poetry, Earth After Rain and Thin Moon Psalm have garnered numerous awards. Her poetry, essays, and fiction have also appeared in many Canadian literary journals and anthologies.

== Bibliography ==
- Earth After Rain. Saskatoon: Thistledown Press, 2001. Poetry
- Thin Moon Psalm. London, ON: Brick Books, 2007. Poetry
- The Season's Vagrant Light: New and Selected Poems. Manchester: Carcanet Press, 2015. Poetry

=== Anthologies ===
- New Poetries V. Schmidt, Michael. Ed. Manchester, UK: Carcanet Press, 2011.
- How the Light Gets In: An Anthology of Contemporary Poetry From Canada. Ennis, John. Ed. Waterford, Ireland: Waterford Institute of Technology, 2009.
- Fast Forward: Saskatchewan's New Poets. Klar, Barbara and Paul Wilson. Eds. Regina: Hagios Press, 2007.
- Breathing Fire 2: Canada's New Poets. Crozier, Lorna and Patrick Lane. Eds. Vancouver: Nightwood Editions, 2005.
- The Third Floor Lounge: Poetry from the 2004 Banff Writing Studio. Dodds, Jeramy. Ed. Toronto: littlefishcartpress, 2005.
- Listening with the Ear of the Heart: An Anthology of Poetry and Prose. Margoshes, Dave and Shelley Sopher. Eds. Muenster: St. Peter's Press, 2003.
