= Joseph Destrée =

Belgian art historian (1853-1932)

Joseph Destrée (3 August 1853 — 26 March 1932) was a Belgian art historian.

Born in Dinant, he received a degree in philosophy and letters from what is today the Université de Namur and also studied law at the Catholic University of Leuven. One of his professors, Edmond Reusens, encouraged him to attend a seminar on archaeology at the University of Bonn in Germany, and in 1886 he was appointed deputy curator of the Musée royal d'antiquités et d'armures, or museum of antiquities and armour, located in the Halle Gate in Brussels.

Destrée would then pursue a career working in museums in Belgium and contributing to art historical publications. In 1894 he published a standalone volume on medieval sculpture in Brabant, Étude sur la sculpture brabançonne au moyen-âge. His interests included the study of wood sculpture, miniatures, tapestry, ivory, and metal arts. He also wrote two studies on illuminated manuscripts: Les heures de Notre-Dame dites de Hennessy on the so-called Hours of Hennessy (1895) and the Les Heures dites da Costa about the Da Costa Book of Hours (1924, co-authored with Pierre Bautier). He also published a study on the painter Hugo van der Goes (1914). Destrée retired in 1920.

He was married to Marie Deharveng, who died in 1912. Joseph Destrée died in Etterbeek in 1932.
