= Binning (surname) =

Binning is a surname. Notable people with the surname include:

- Bob Binning (1935–2005), New Zealand fencer
- B. C. Binning (1909–1976), Canadian painter
- Hugh Binning (1627–1653), Scottish philosopher and theologian
- Jimmy Binning (1922–1991), Scottish soccer player
- Walter Binning, 16th-century Scottish painter and glazier
