= Bob Brenning =

Australian rugby league footballer

Robert 'Bob' Brenning (1932–1959) was a professional rugby league footballer in the Australian competition, the New South Wales Rugby League (NSWRL) premiership.

A Front-row forward, Brenning played for the Eastern Suburbs club, he made 20 1st grade appearances for that club in the years 1957-58 and is recognised as being that Eastern Suburbs club's 471st player. Brenning is also the Great uncle of Parramatta players Ian and Nathan Hindmarsh.

Brenning was killed when the work machinery he was operating struck high voltage power lines in 1959.

== Sources ==
- The Encyclopedia of Rugby League players – Alan Whiticker & Glen Hudson
