= Rothschild Prayerbook =

Flemish illuminated manuscript (ca. 1510–20)

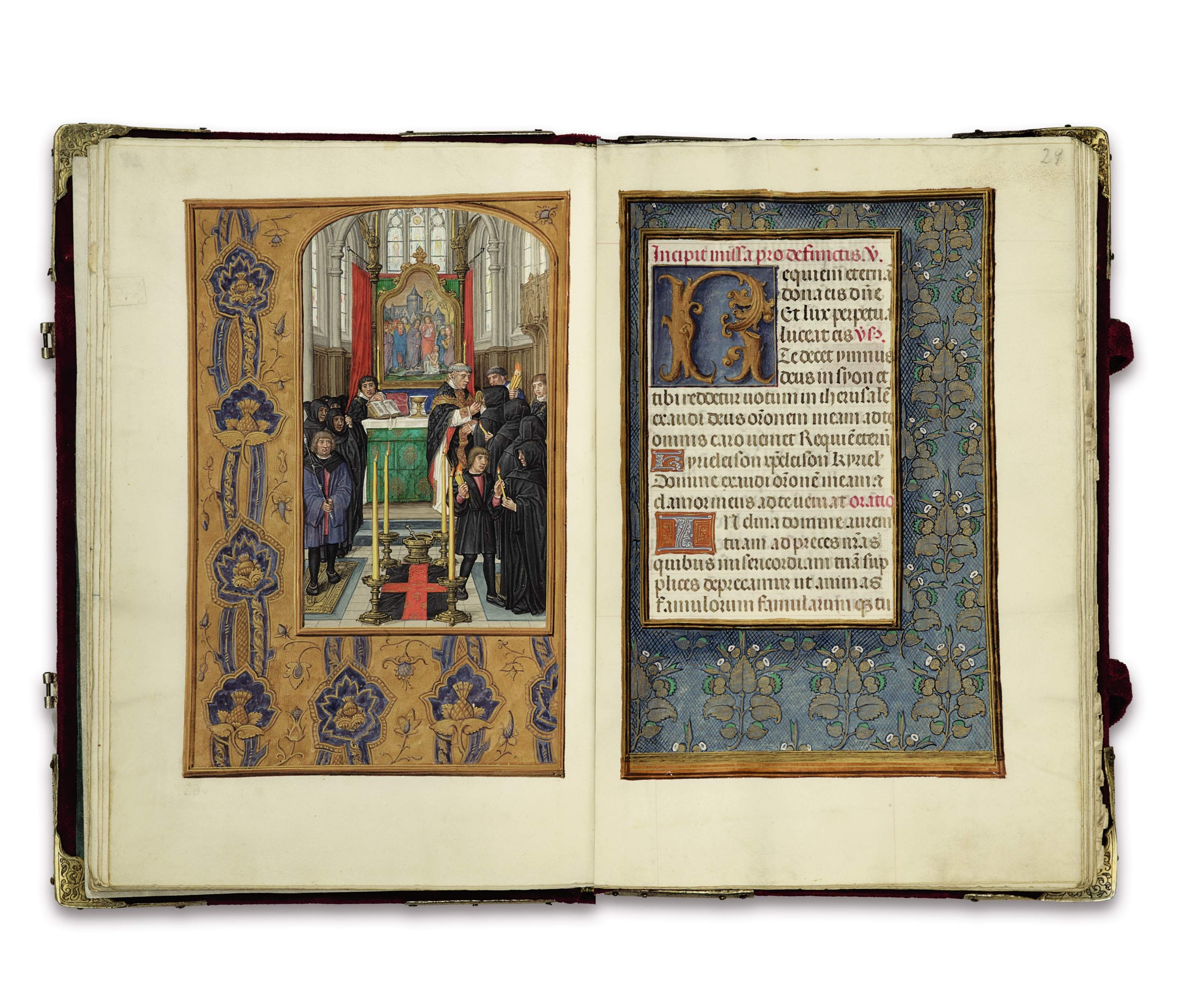
Opening from the Rothschild Prayerbook; Requiem Mass left. The borders depict rich silks illusionistically.

The Rothschild Prayerbook or Rothschild Hours (both titles are used for other books), is an important Flemish illuminated manuscript book of hours, compiled c. 1500–1520 by a number of artists.

It has 254 folios, with a page size of 228 × 160 mm. After a Nazi-era confiscation from the Austrian branch of the Rothschild family, it was in the Austrian National Library in Vienna as Codex Vindobonensis S.N. 2844, before being returned. Since its sale in 1999 it has held the world record price at auction for an illuminated manuscript. In 2014 it was purchased by Australian businessman Kerry Stokes from Christie's New York and is on display in the National Library of Australia.

== Illuminations ==
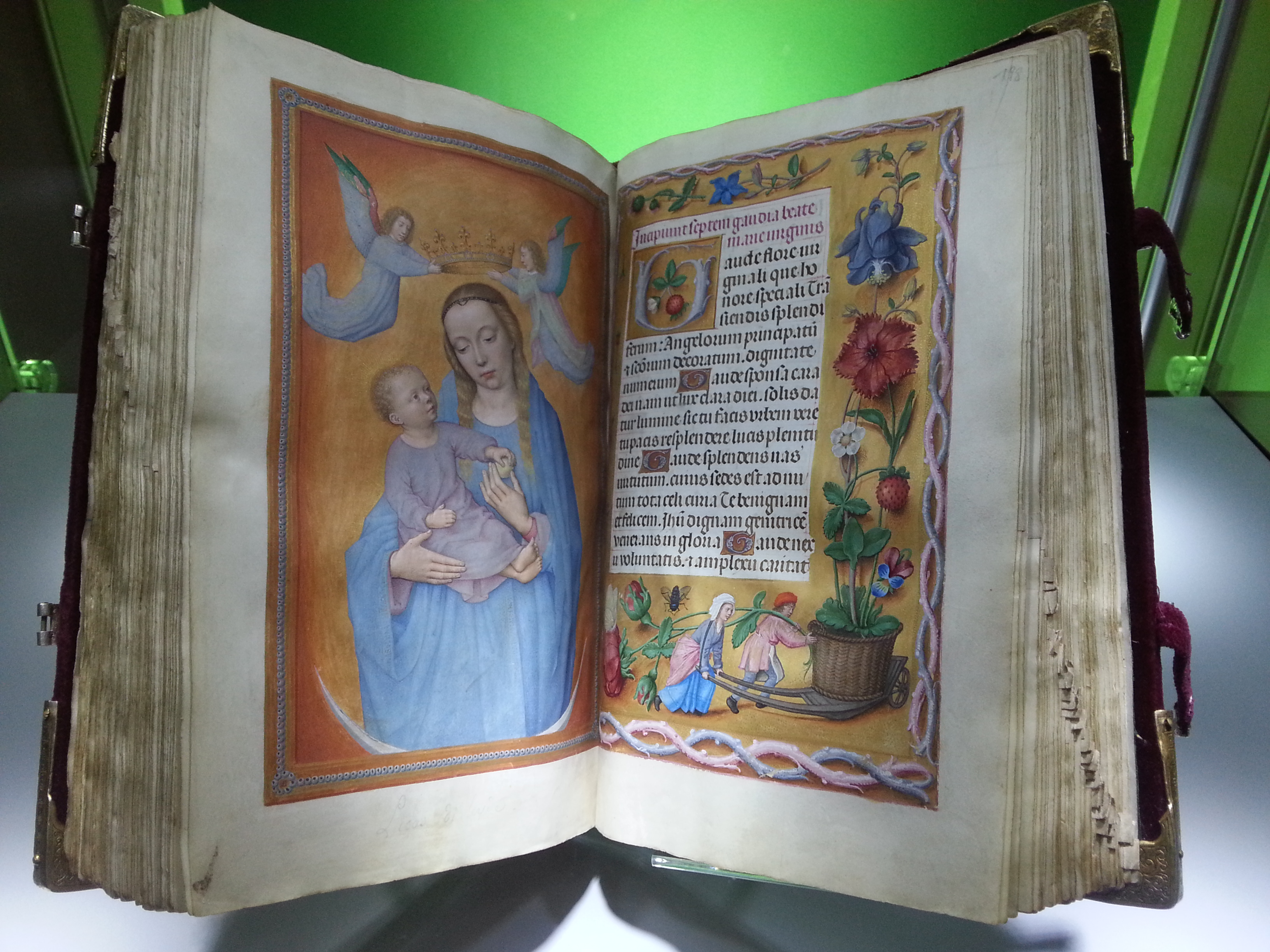
Rothschild Prayerbook, two-page opening

It contains the work of several leading miniaturists of the final flowering of the Ghent-Bruges school of Flemish illumination, who also co-operated on the Grimani Breviary, the Spinola Hours (Getty, Malibu) and other major manuscripts of these years. Most of the sixty-seven large miniatures are by the "Master of the First Prayer Book of Maximilian", an older artist, and Gerard Horenbout or the Master of James IV of Scotland (these being two names probably for the same artist). Other miniatures are by Gerard David, better known as a panel painter, or a pupil working in his style, with two miniatures by Simon Bening, and other work by further masters.

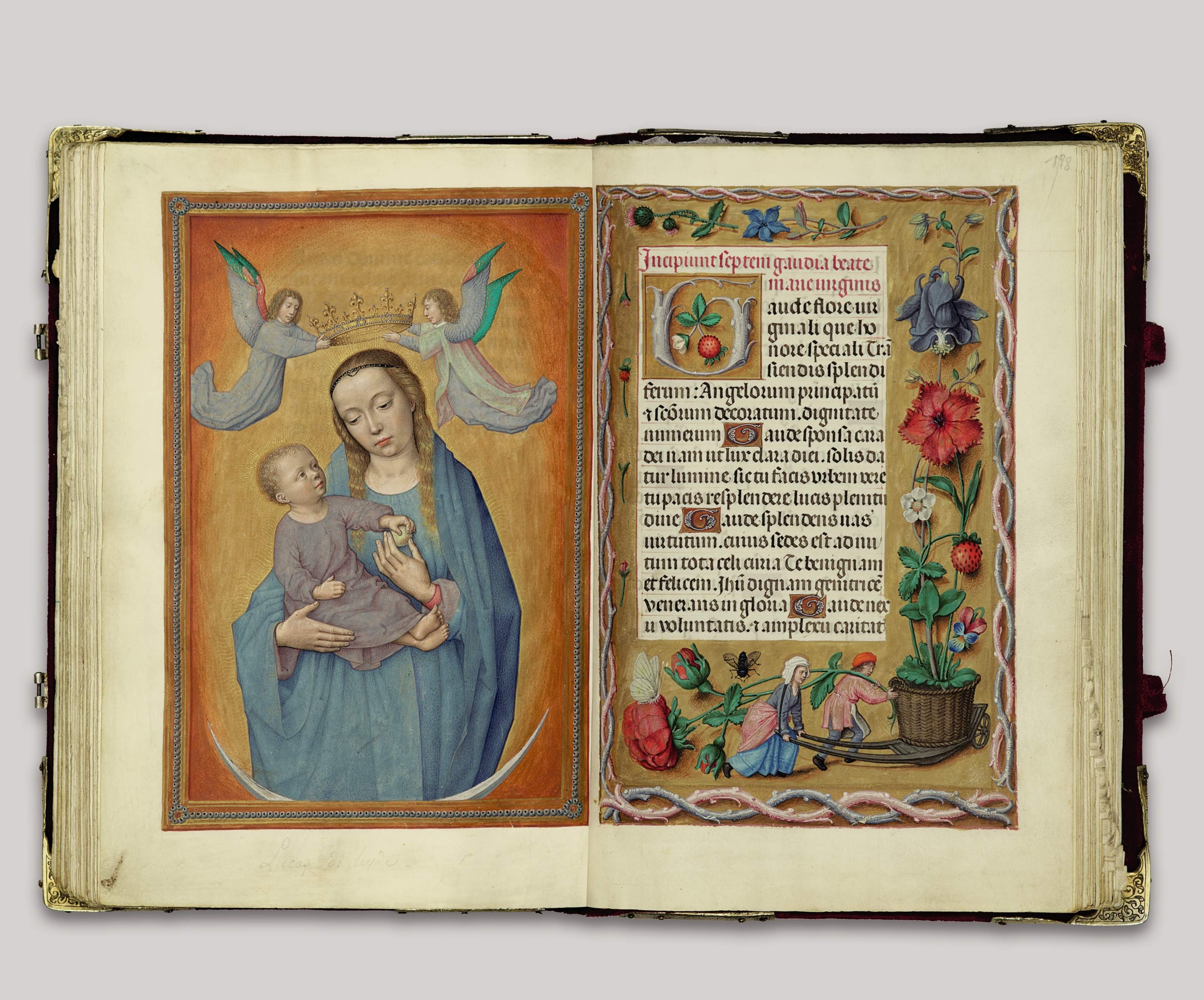
Virgin and Child on a Crescent Moon, f.197v. Accepted as by Gerard David, one of only a few miniatures attributed to him.

There are wide borders, many with flowers and other objects and drolleries, and another group with trompe-l'œil imitations of bronzes. Other borders frame the miniature with illusionistically painted wooden tracery. Some pages follow the fashion of showing one scene as a framed inset within another larger one, In total 140 pages, over half of the whole book, have significant decoration outside the text. The calendar has scenes of the Labours of the Months at the bottom of the pages. As with other very lavishly illuminated manuscripts, it was probably worked on over a long period.

== History ==
The early history of the book is obscure, and the original owner is unknown, though he or she would clearly have been a very wealthy person. This is a feature shared by several important manuscripts of the late Ghent-Bruges school, where typically the heraldry and portraits of the owners of most luxury manuscripts are not found.

The contents of the book, which has extra mass texts and prayers beyond those usually found in a book of hours, contain distinctive elements that relate it to the Chartreuse des Dunes, near Bruges. By 1500 the printed book of hours had largely replaced manuscript ones, except for luxury books like this, which were restricted to the higher nobility and royalty. The manuscript belonged to the princely Wittelsbach family in the 16th century, and then to the library of the counts palatine in Heidelberg, leaving that collection before 1623. Its history is then unknown until it reappeared in the collection of the Viennese branch of the Rothschild family in the late 19th century.

It was confiscated from Louis Nathaniel von Rothschild immediately after the March 1938 German annexation of Austria. After the end of World War II, the new Austrian government used legislation forbidding the export of culturally significant works of art in part to pressure the Rothschilds into "donating" a large number of works to Austrian museums, including the prayerbook, which went to the National Library. In exchange the family was allowed to export other works. Under international pressure over this and similar disputes, the government of Austria returned the book and other works of art to the Rothschild family in 1999. The book was sold for them by Christie's auction house in London on 8 July 1999 for £8,580,000 (then $13,400,000), still the world record auction price for an illuminated manuscript before they sold it themselves. The prayerbook was offered for sale again at Christie's, New York, on 29 January 2014, when it fetched £8,195,783.

The bidder remained anonymous until September 2014, when it was revealed on the Australian TV program Sunday Night that Kerry Stokes, an Australian businessman, billionaire and owner of the Seven Network that Sunday Night airs on, had purchased it. The Prayerbook is part of Stokes' collection in Perth, Australia and was loaned to the National Library of Australia in Canberra for display.

A full facsimile has been published: E. Trenkier, Rothschild Gebetbuch: facsimile und comentarium, Codices Selecti, 67 (Graz, 1979).

== Gallery ==
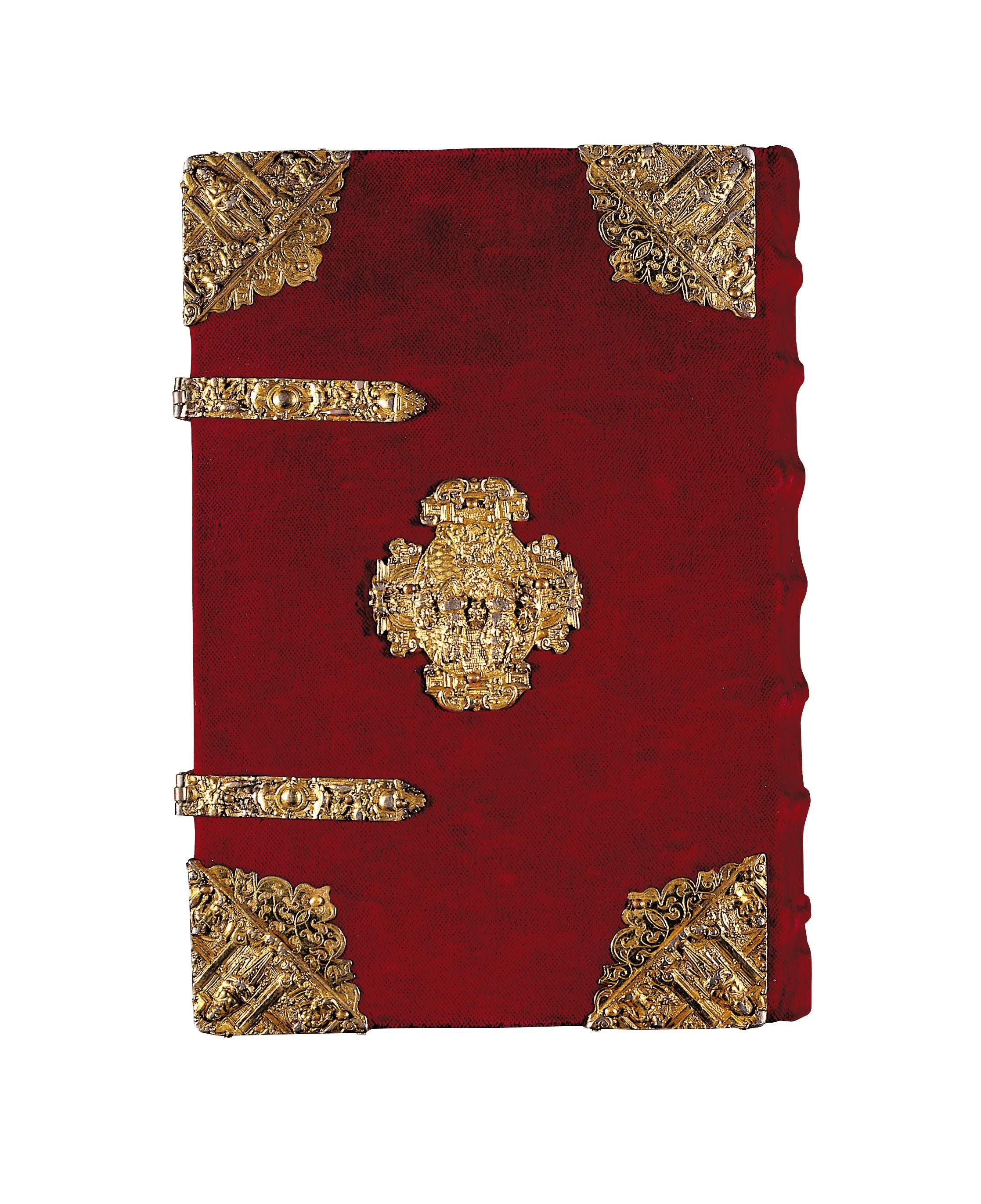

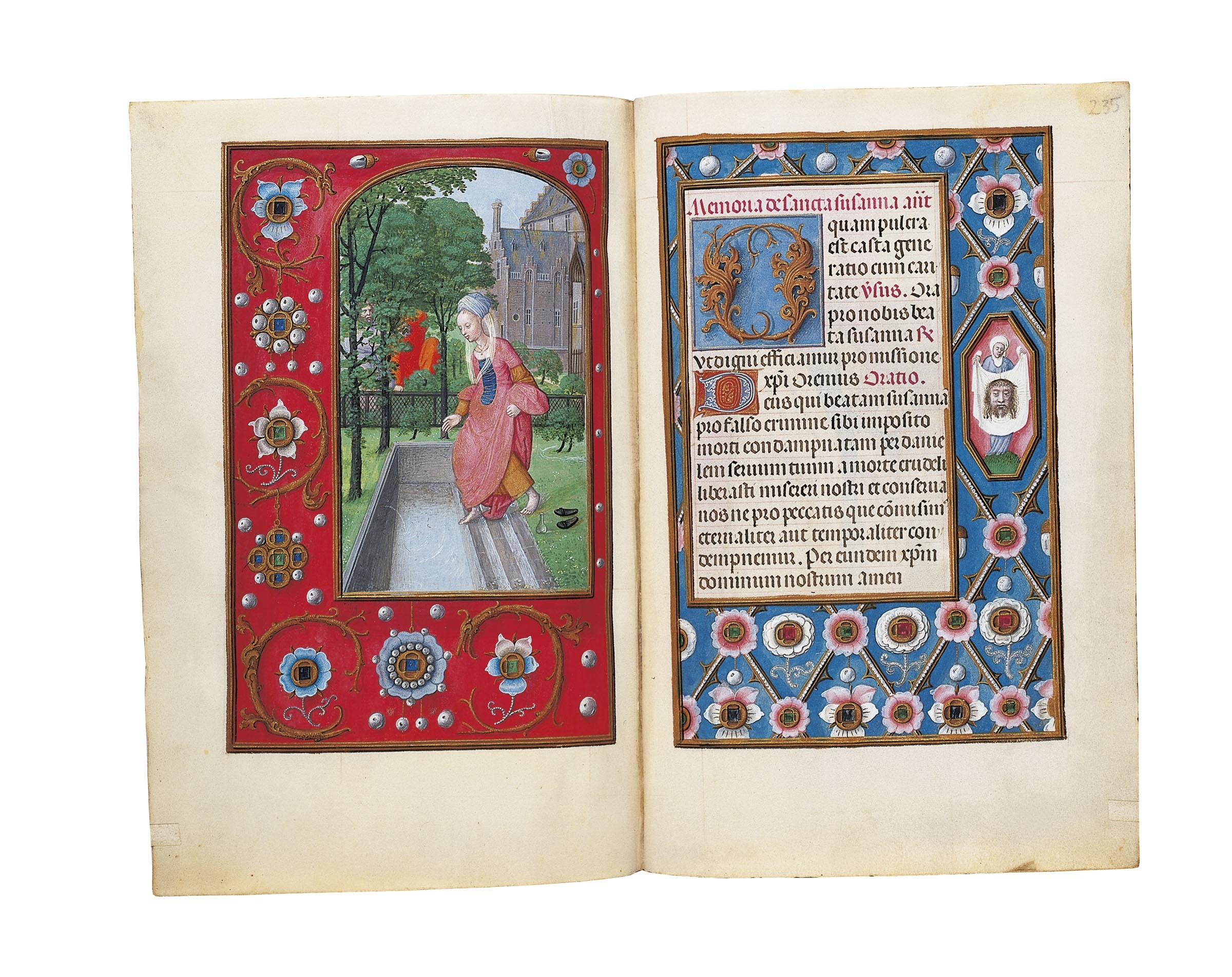

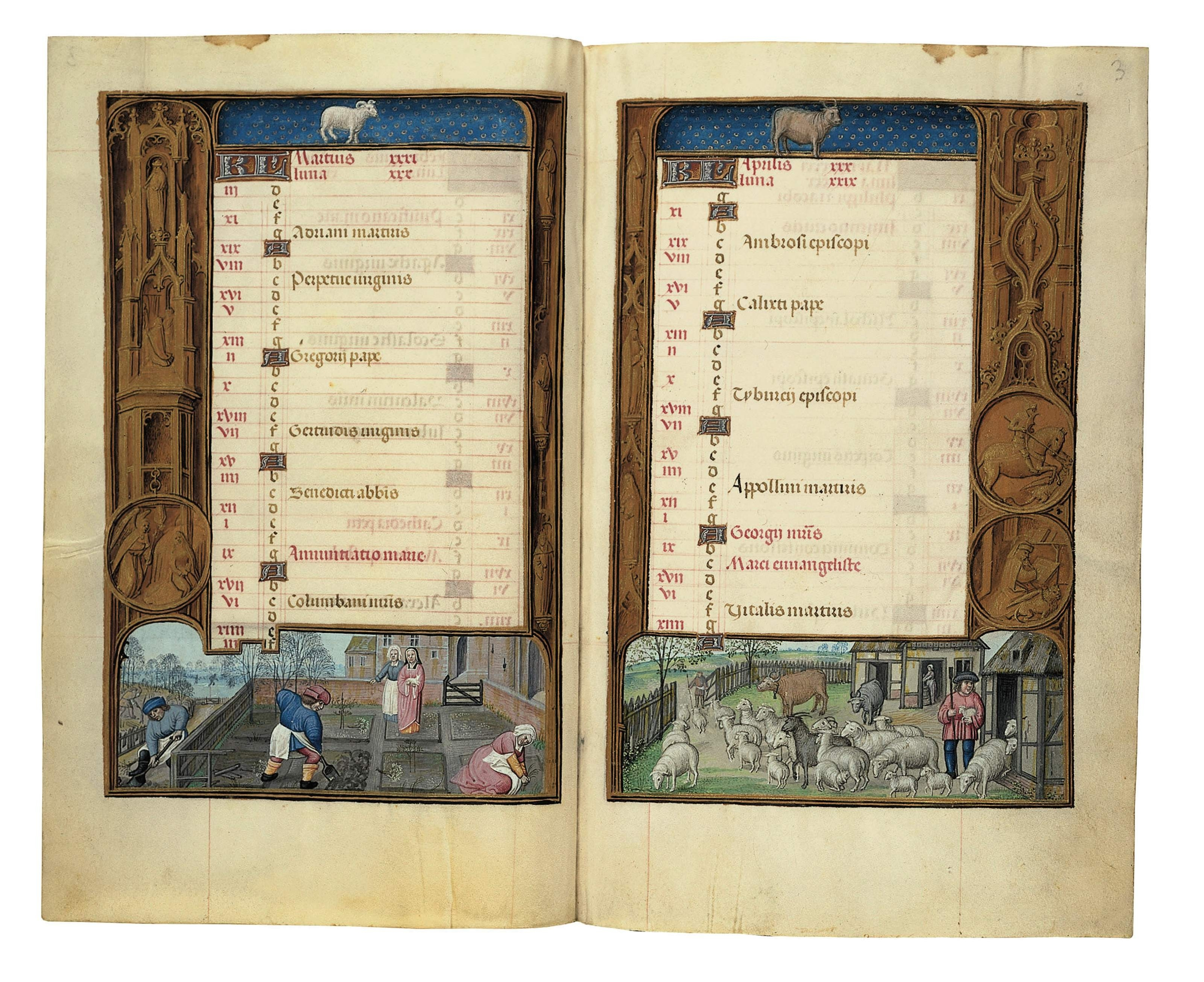

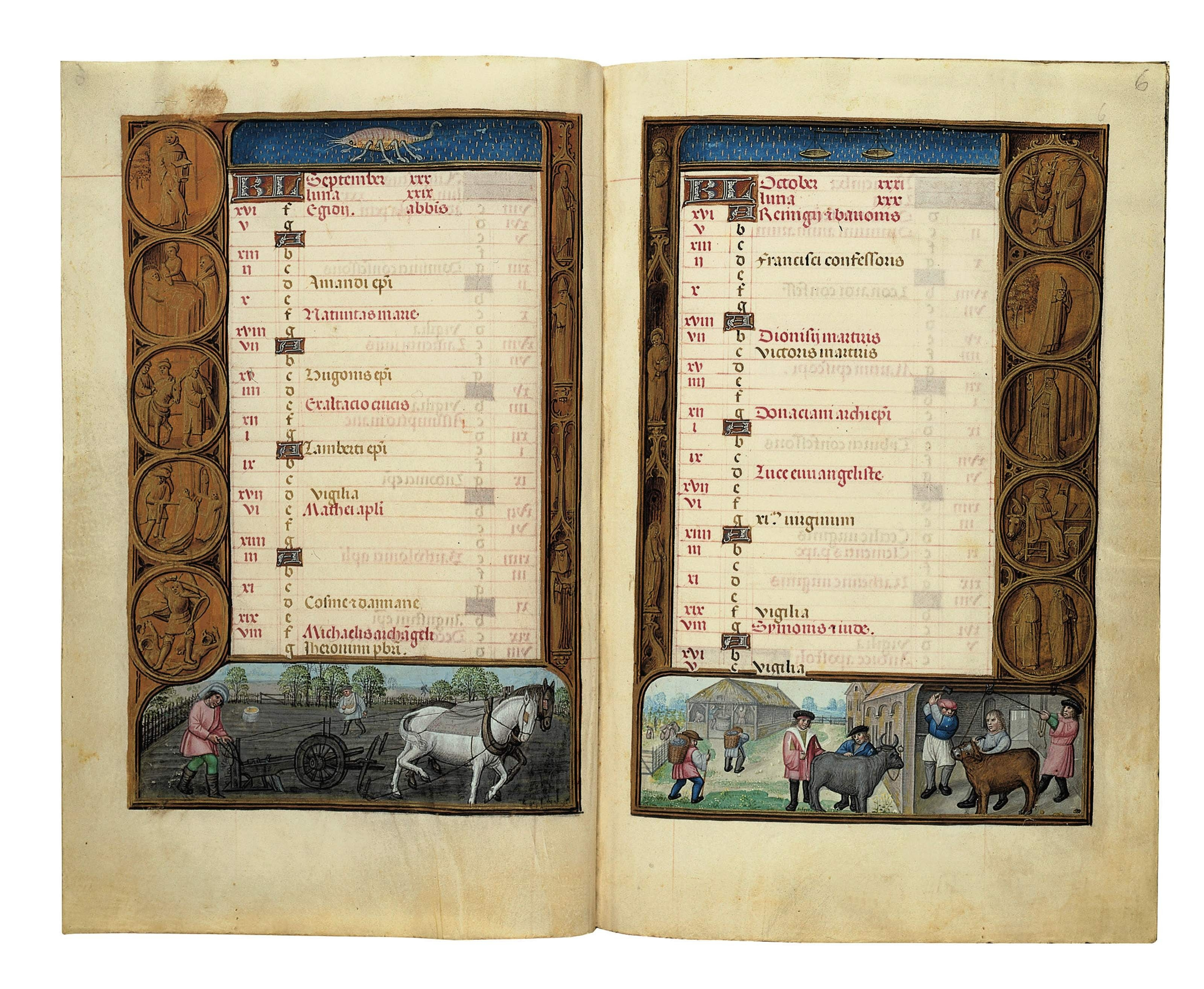

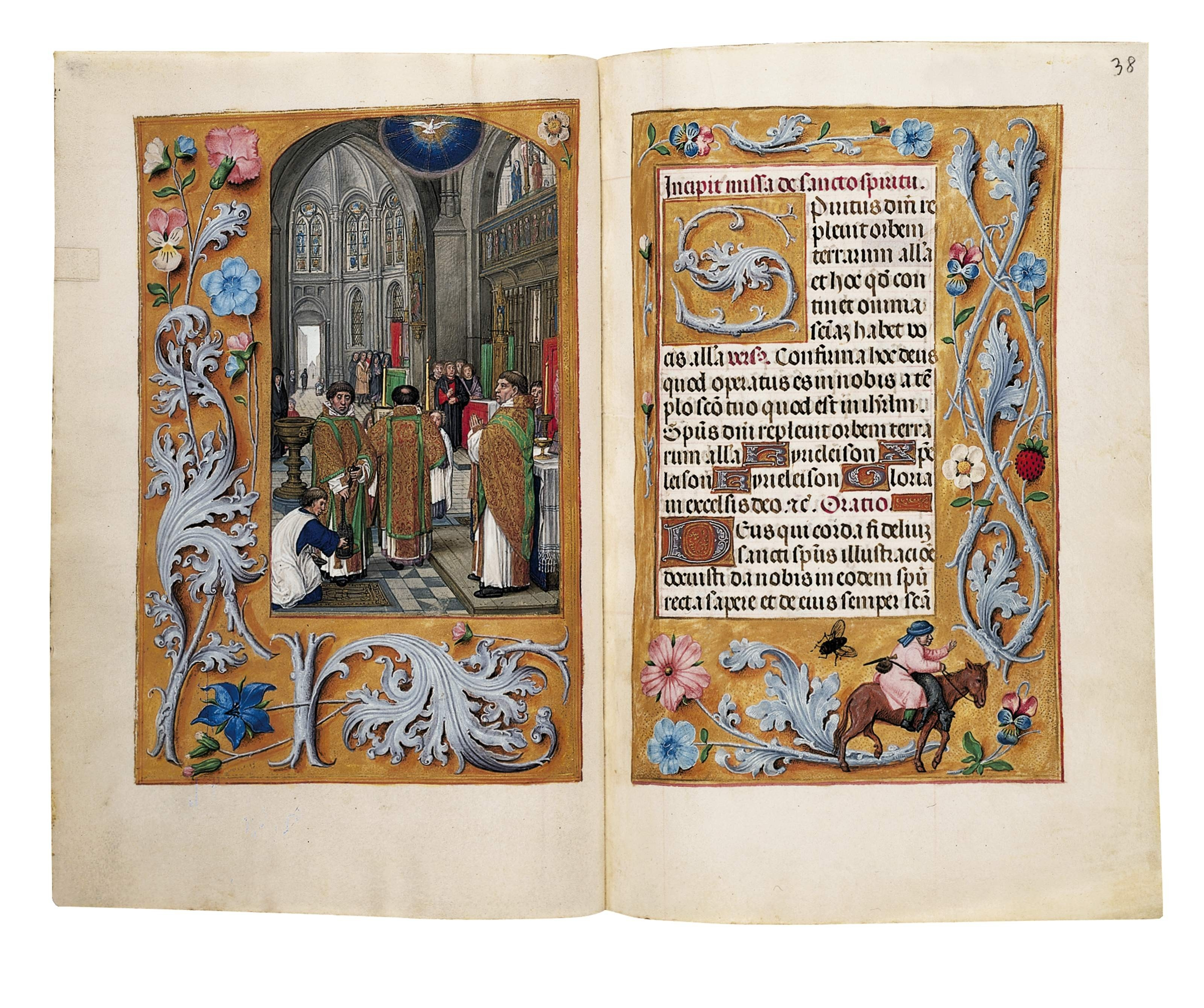

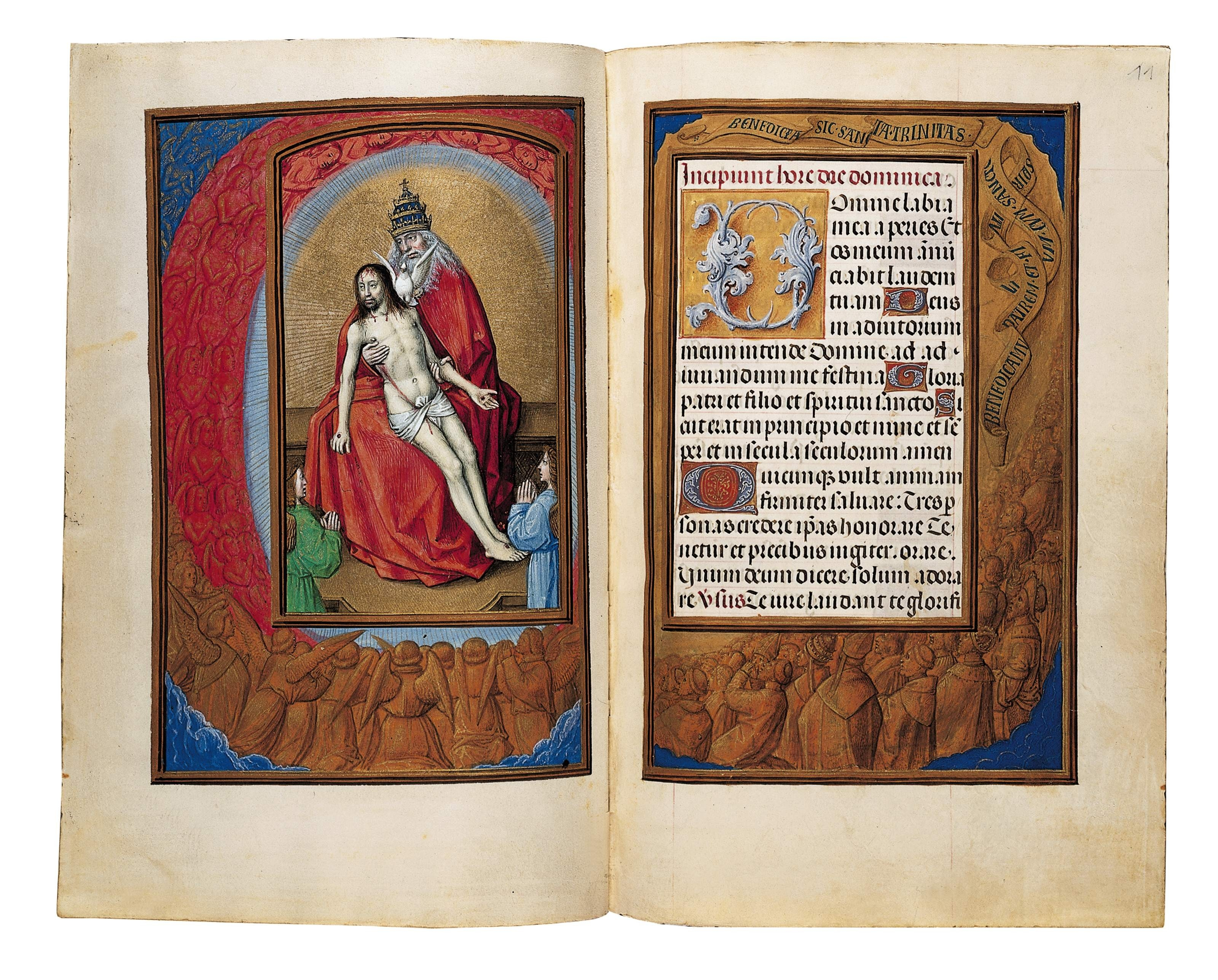

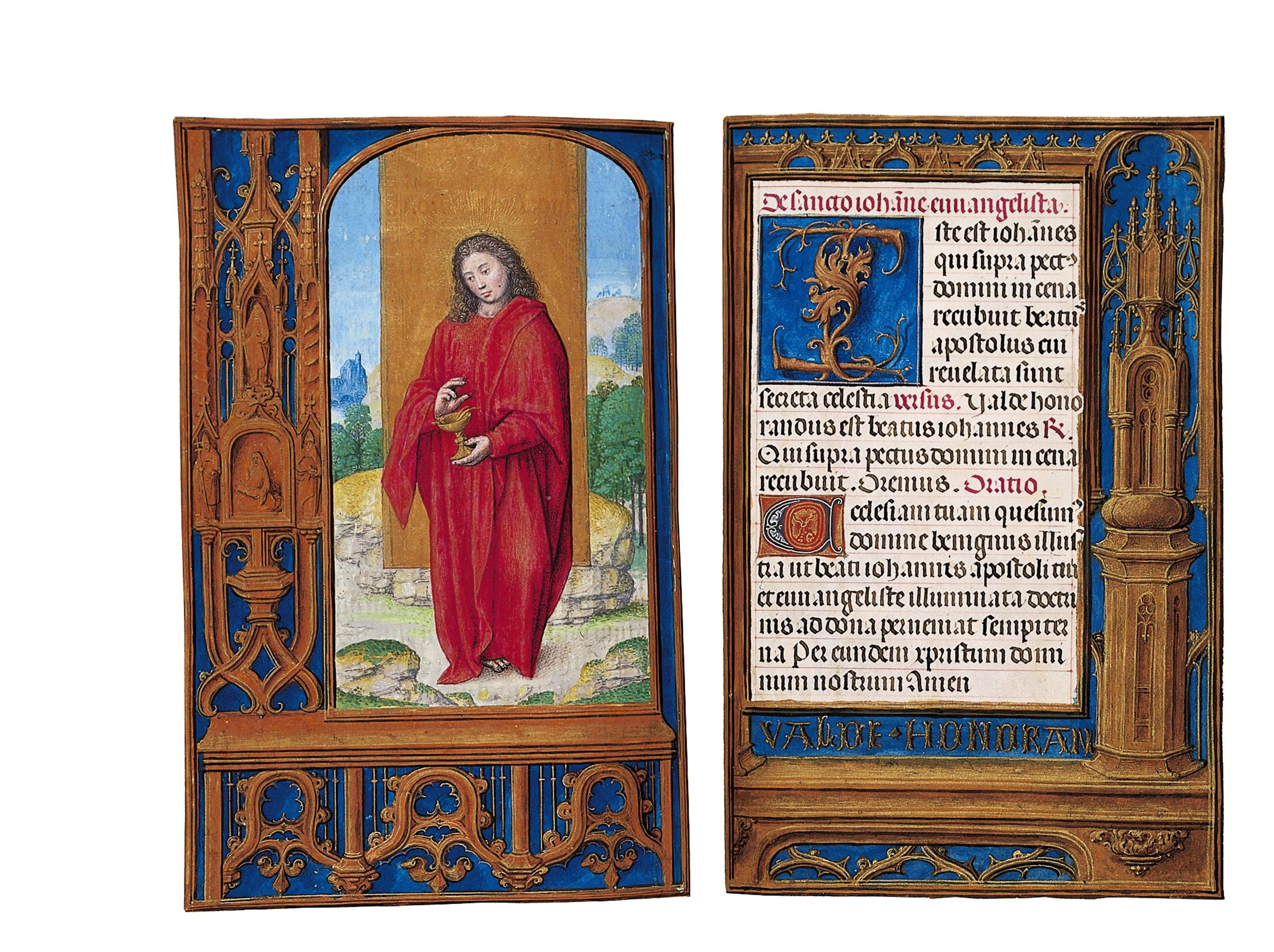

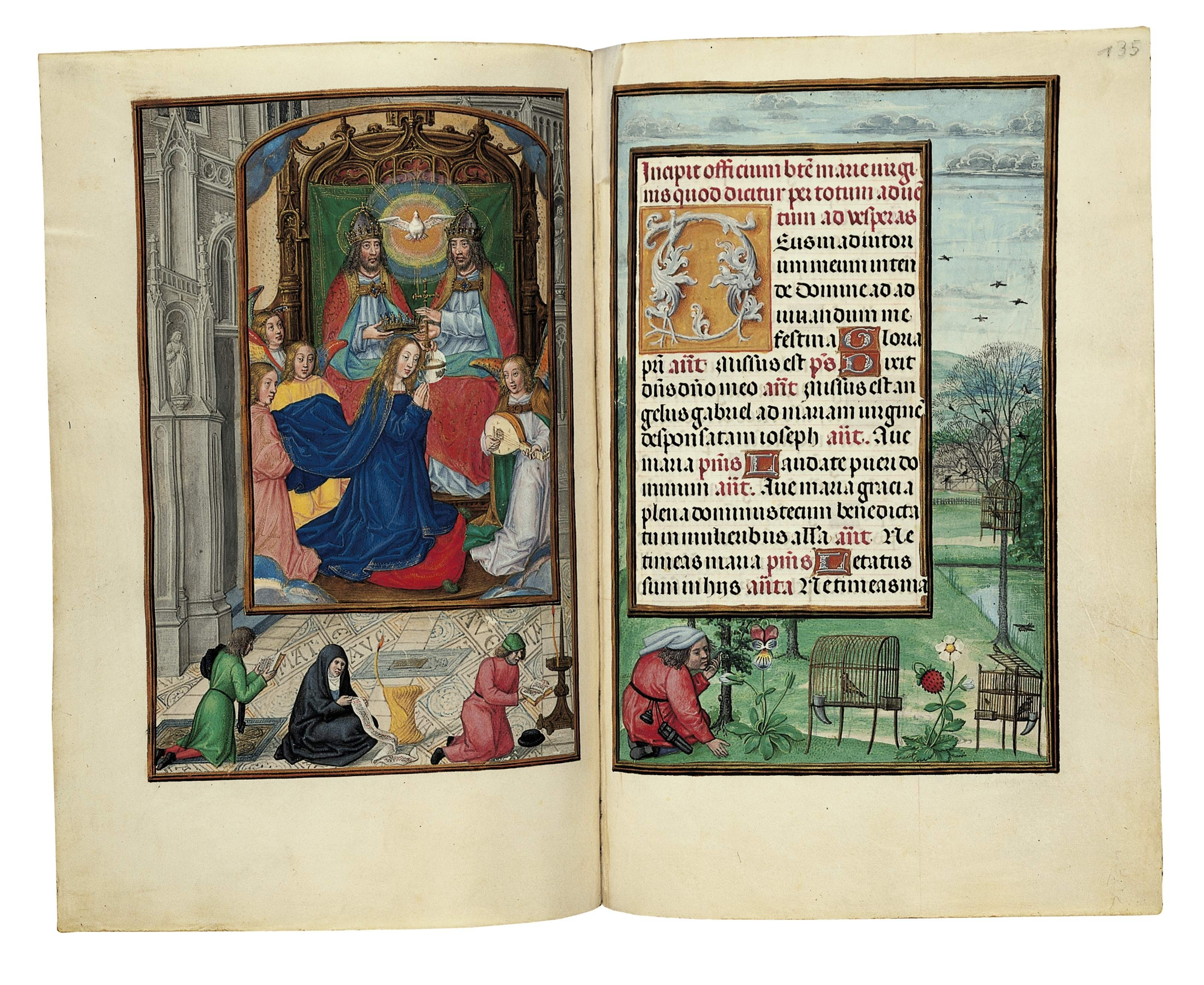

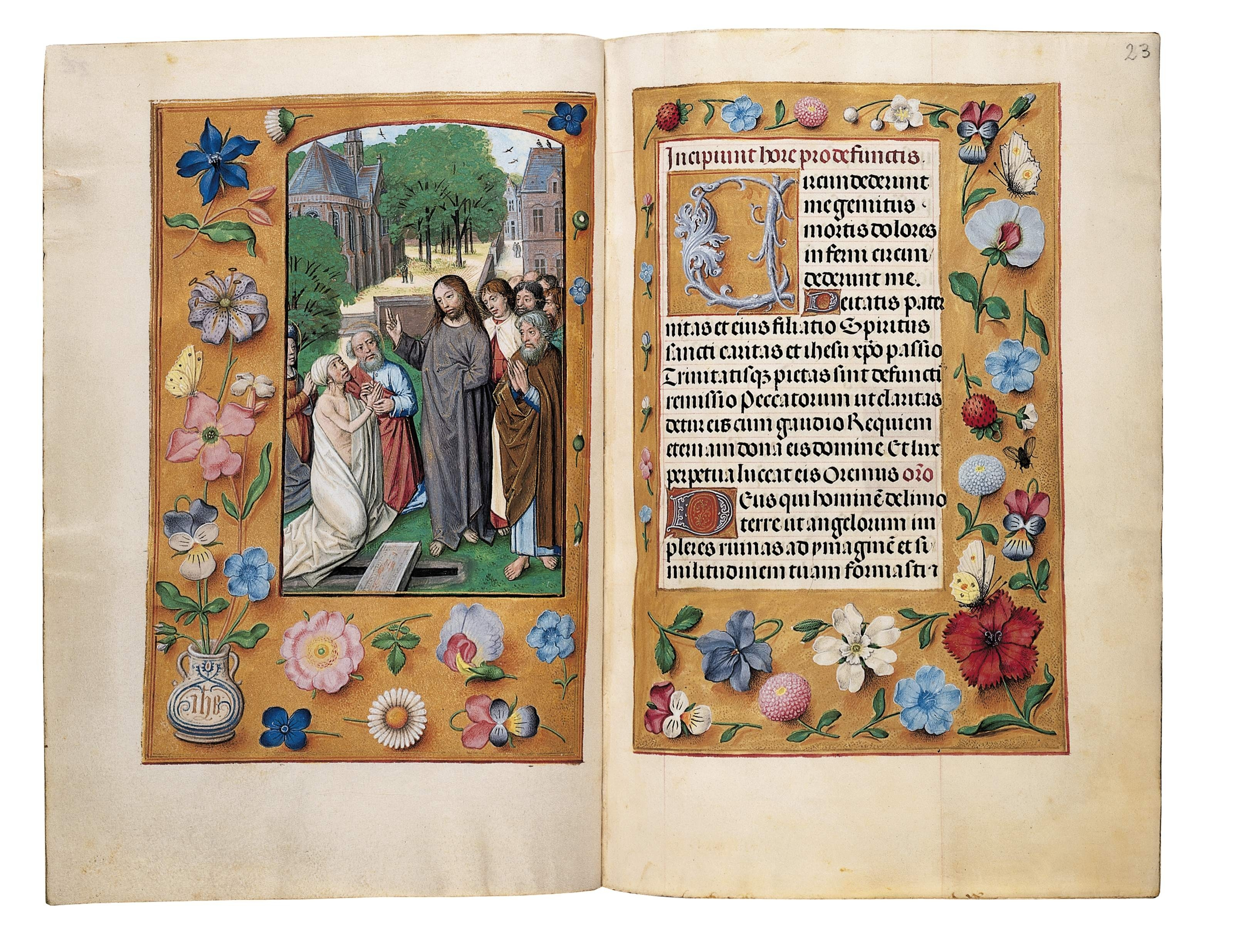

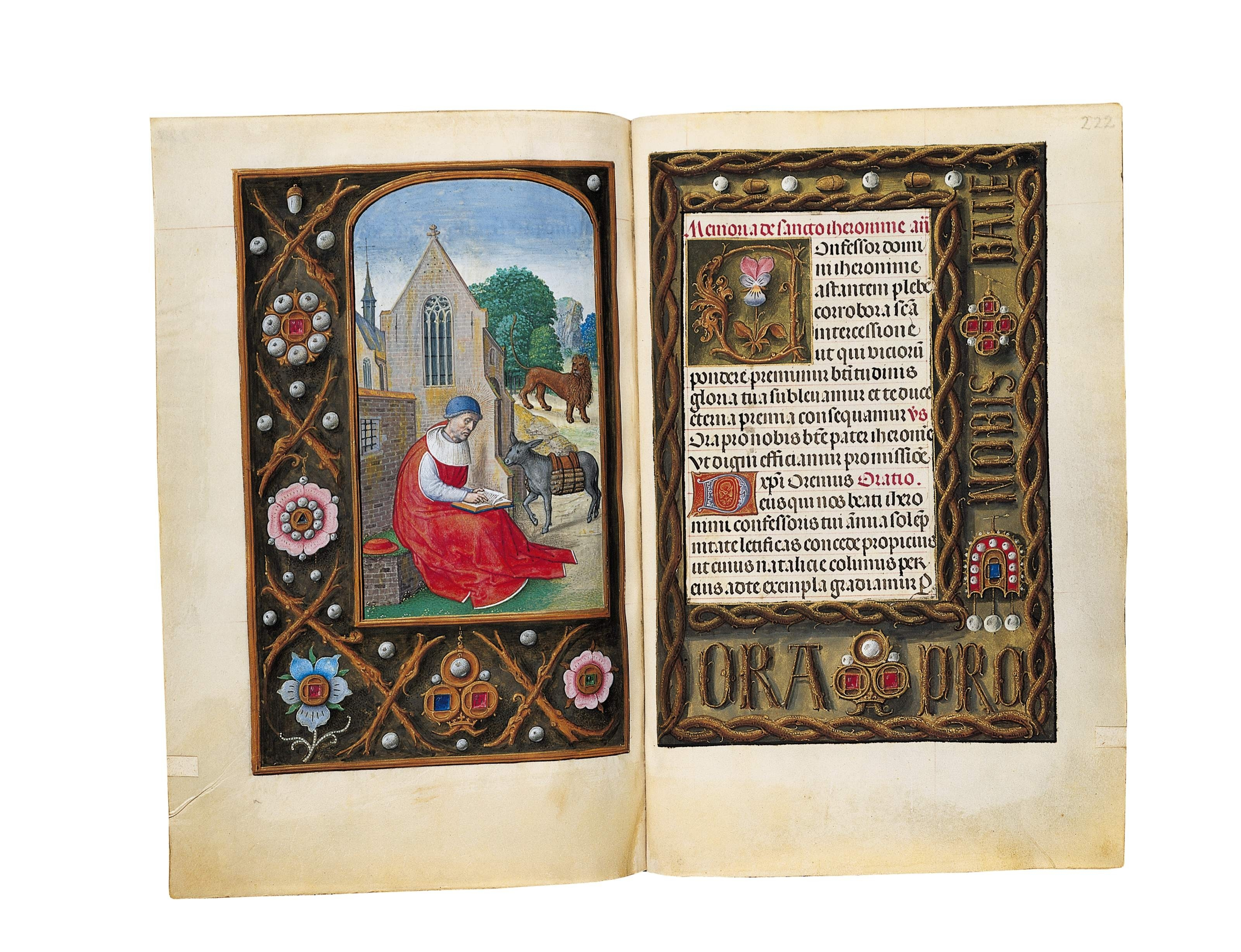

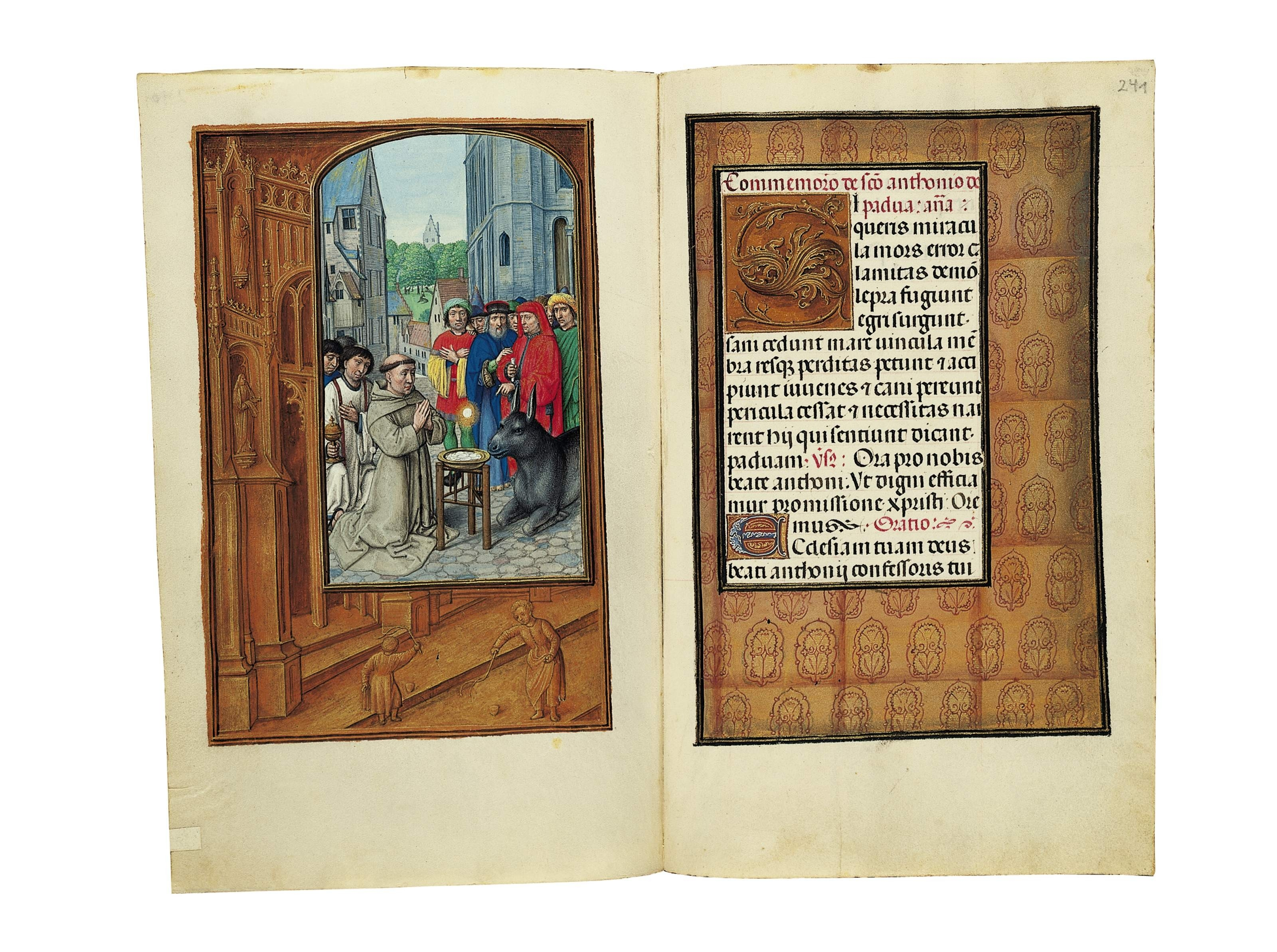

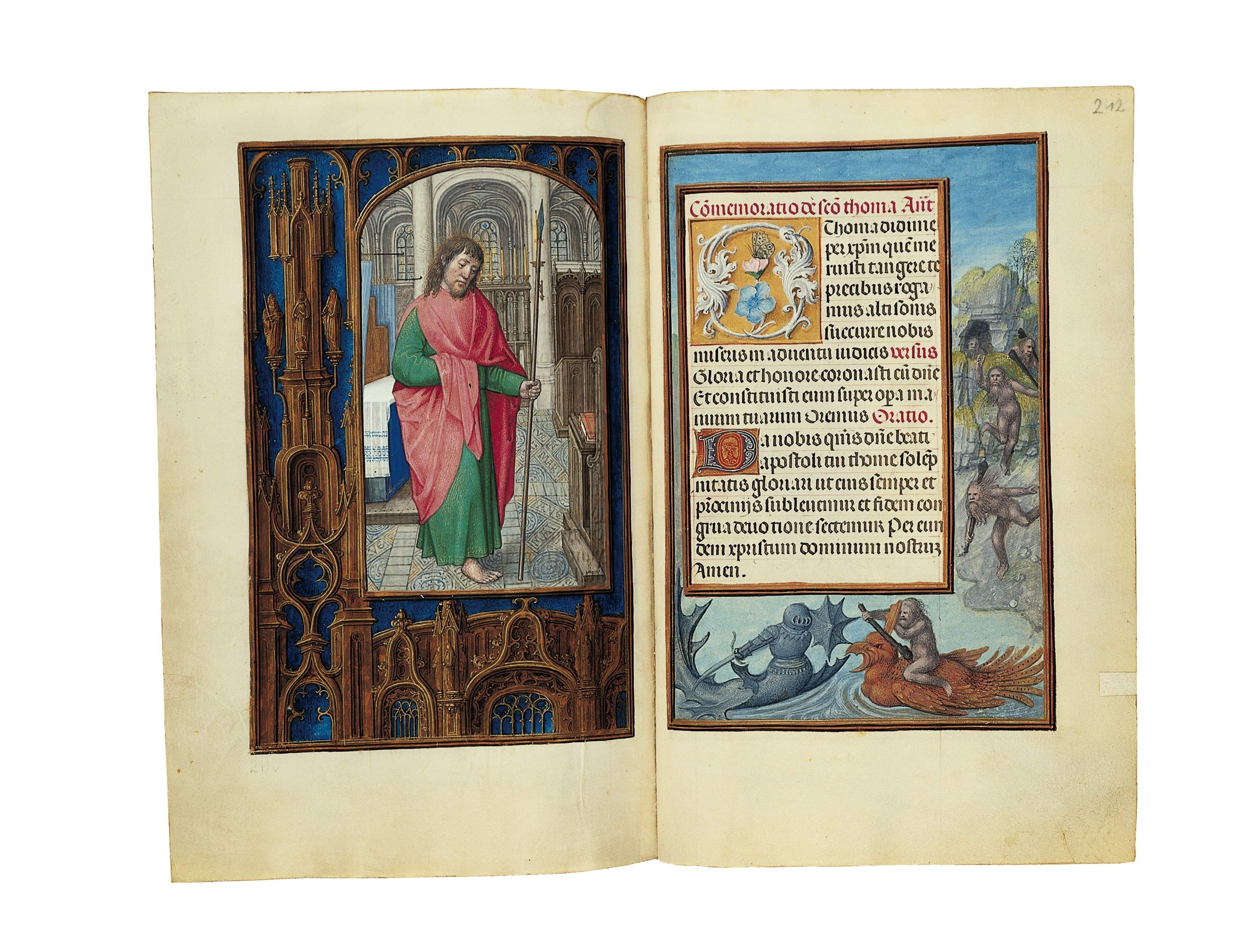

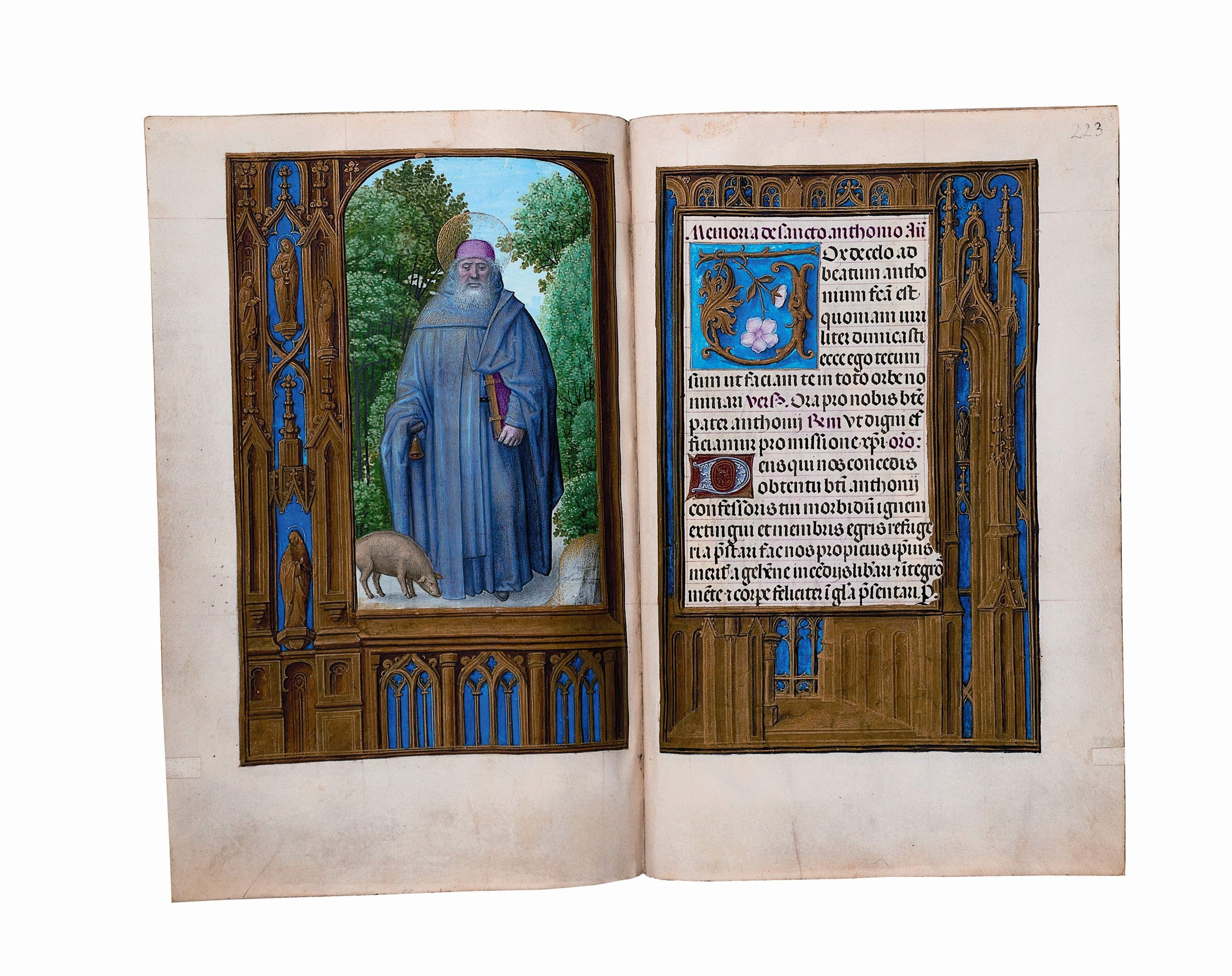

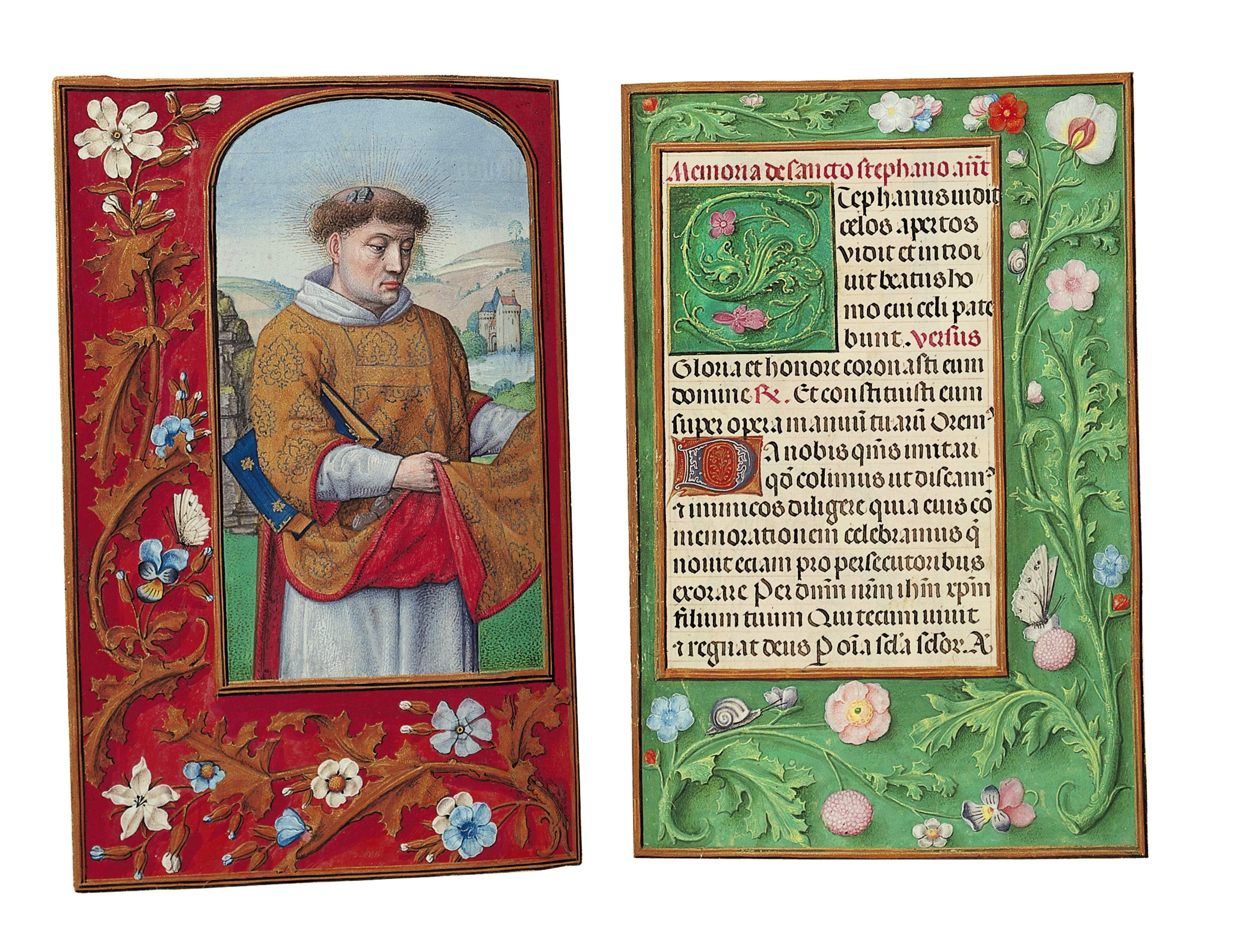

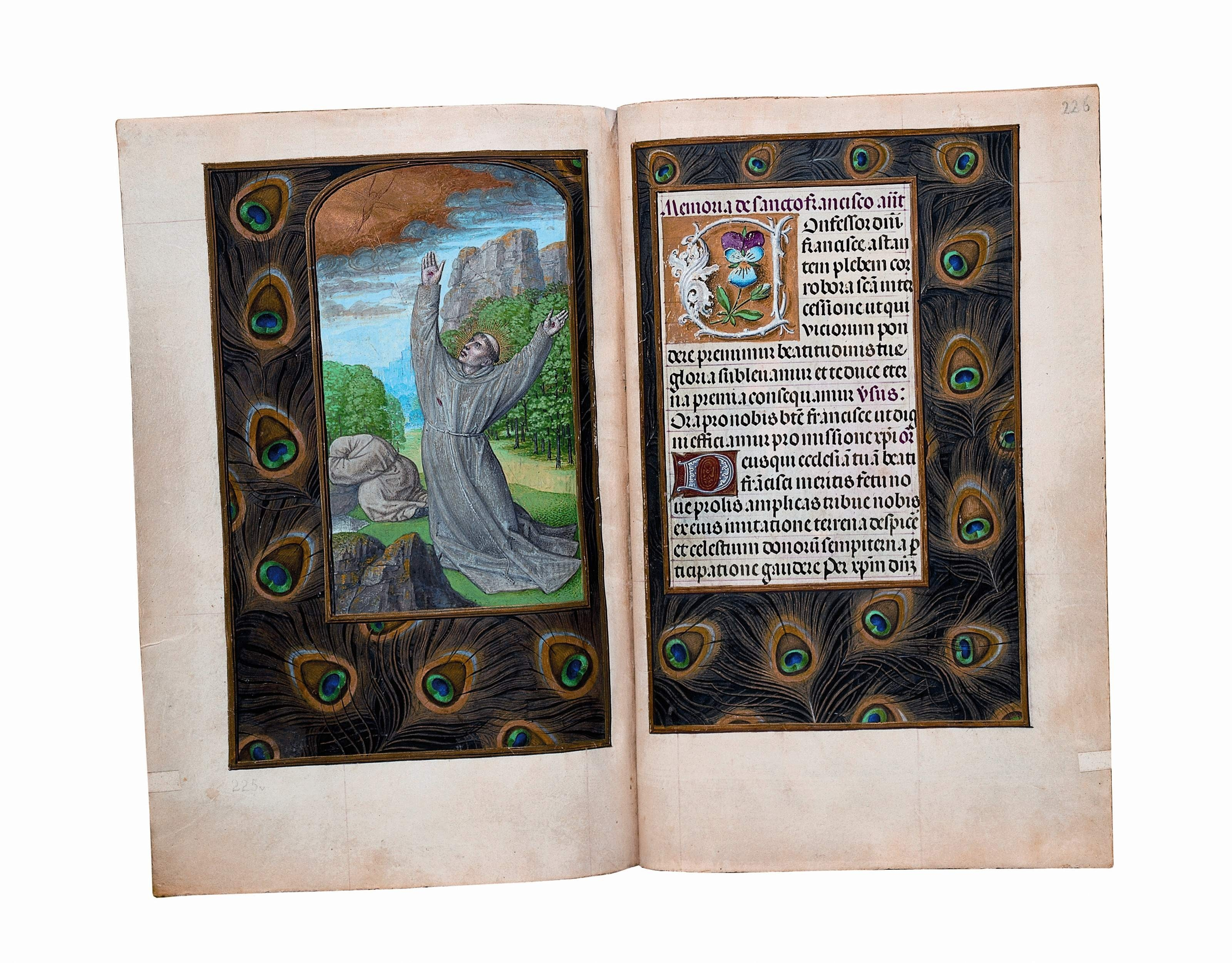

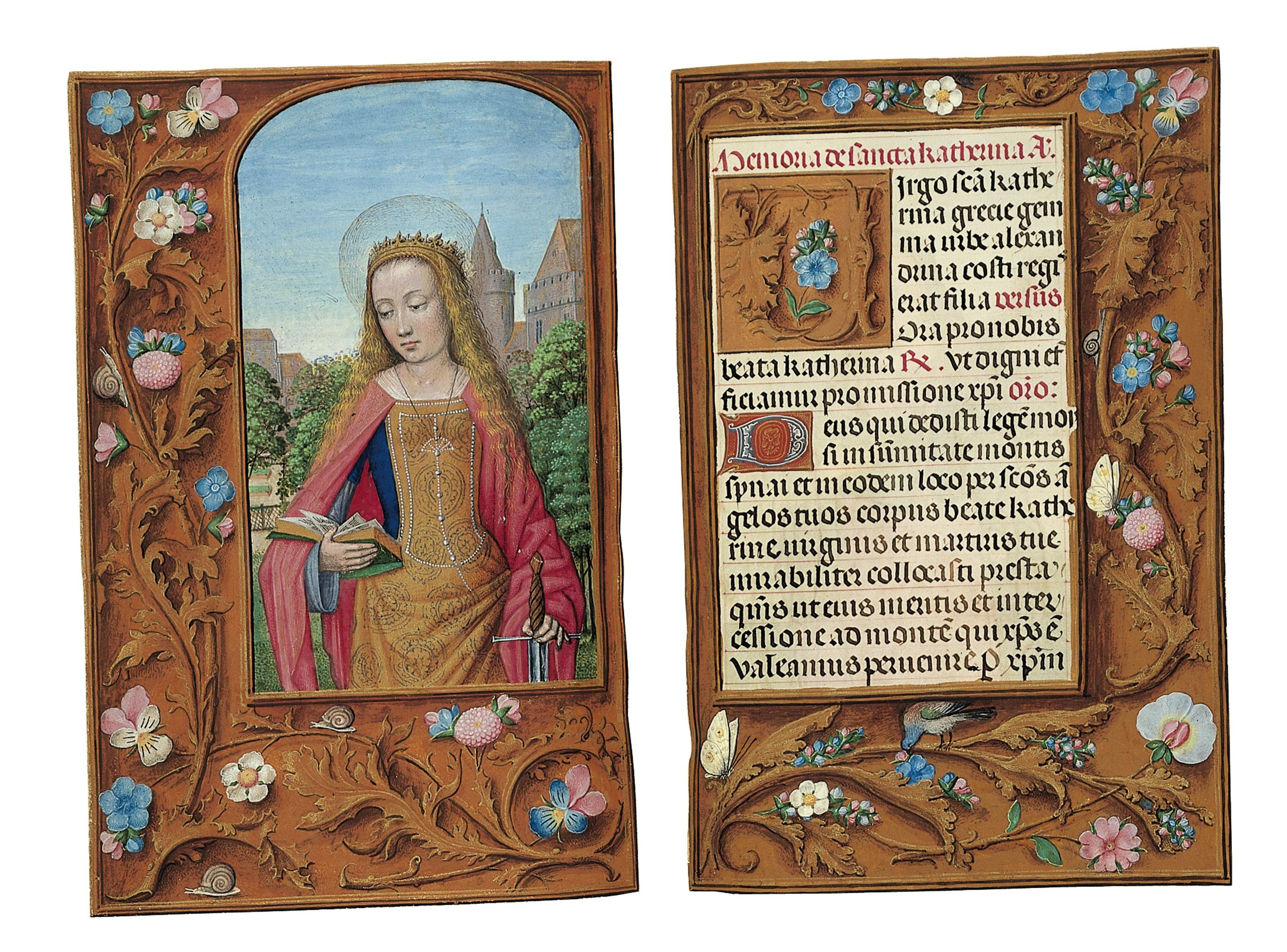

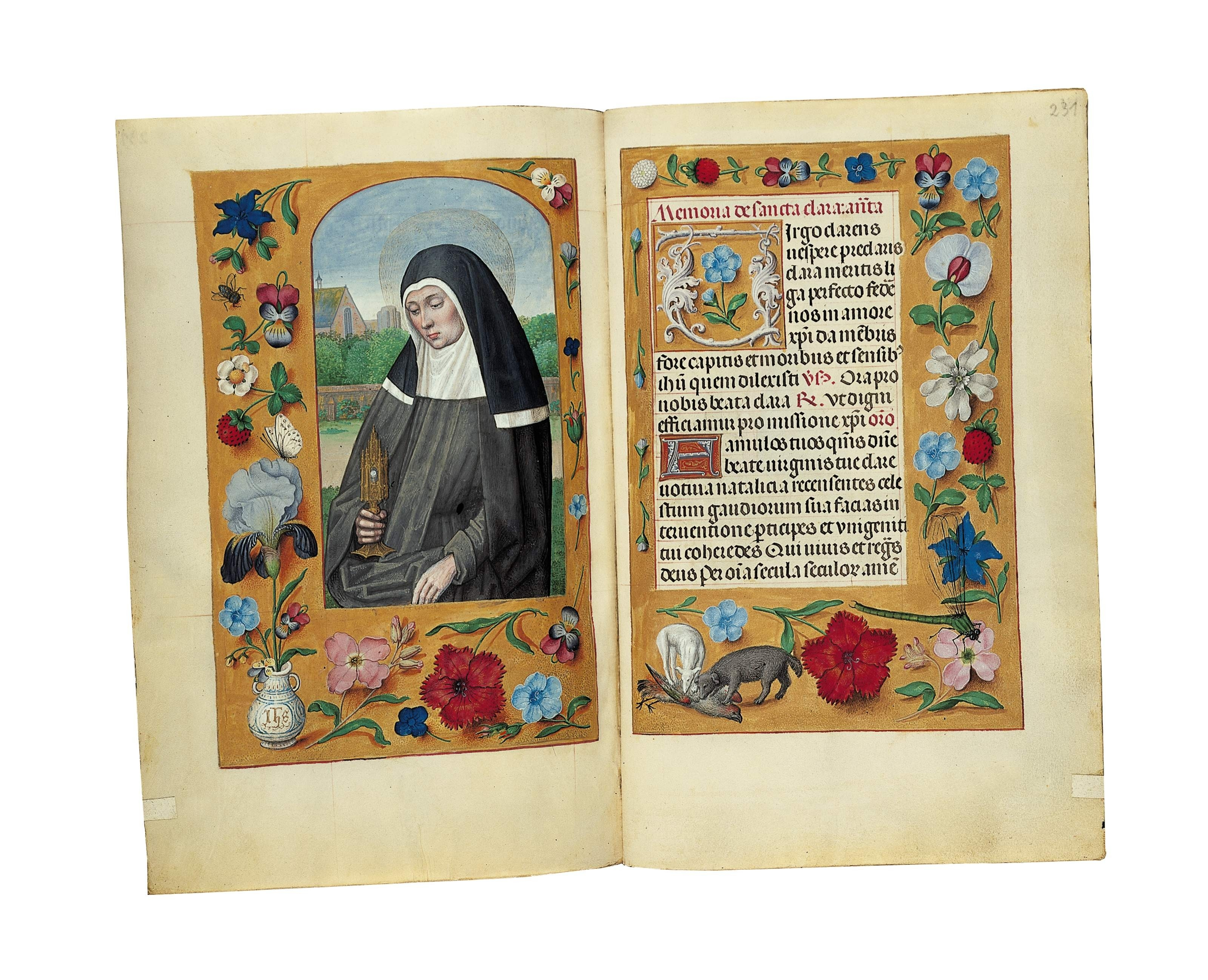

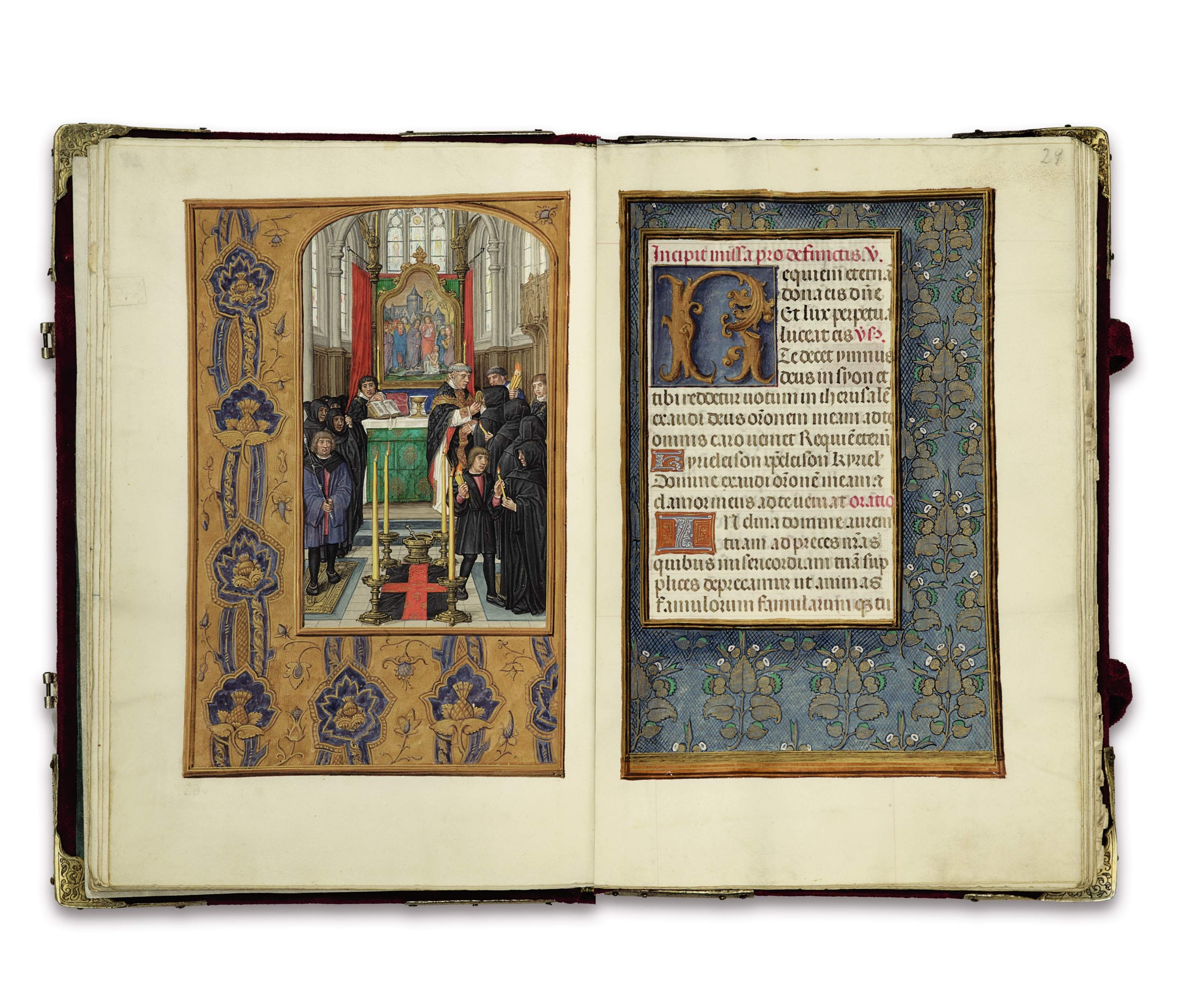

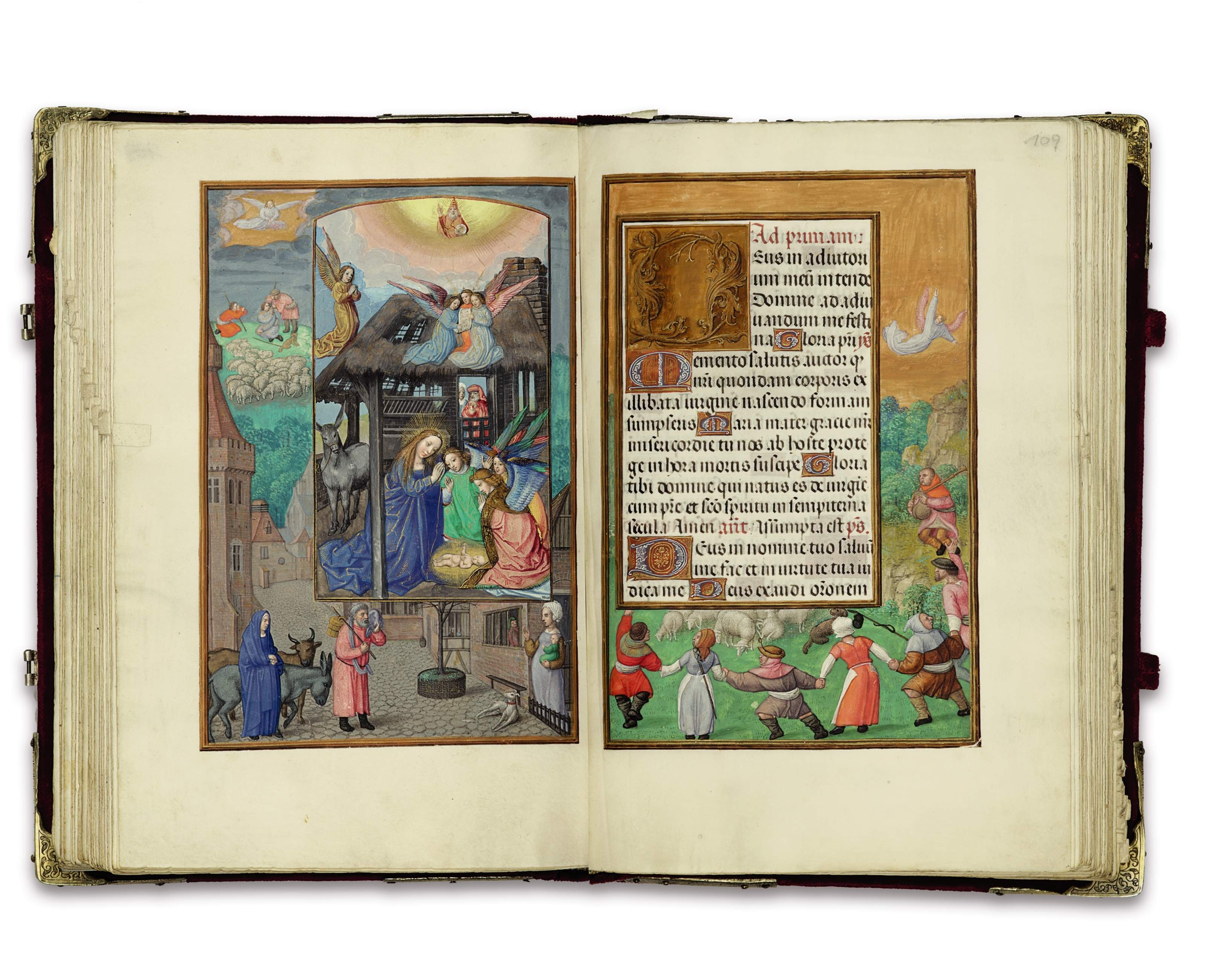

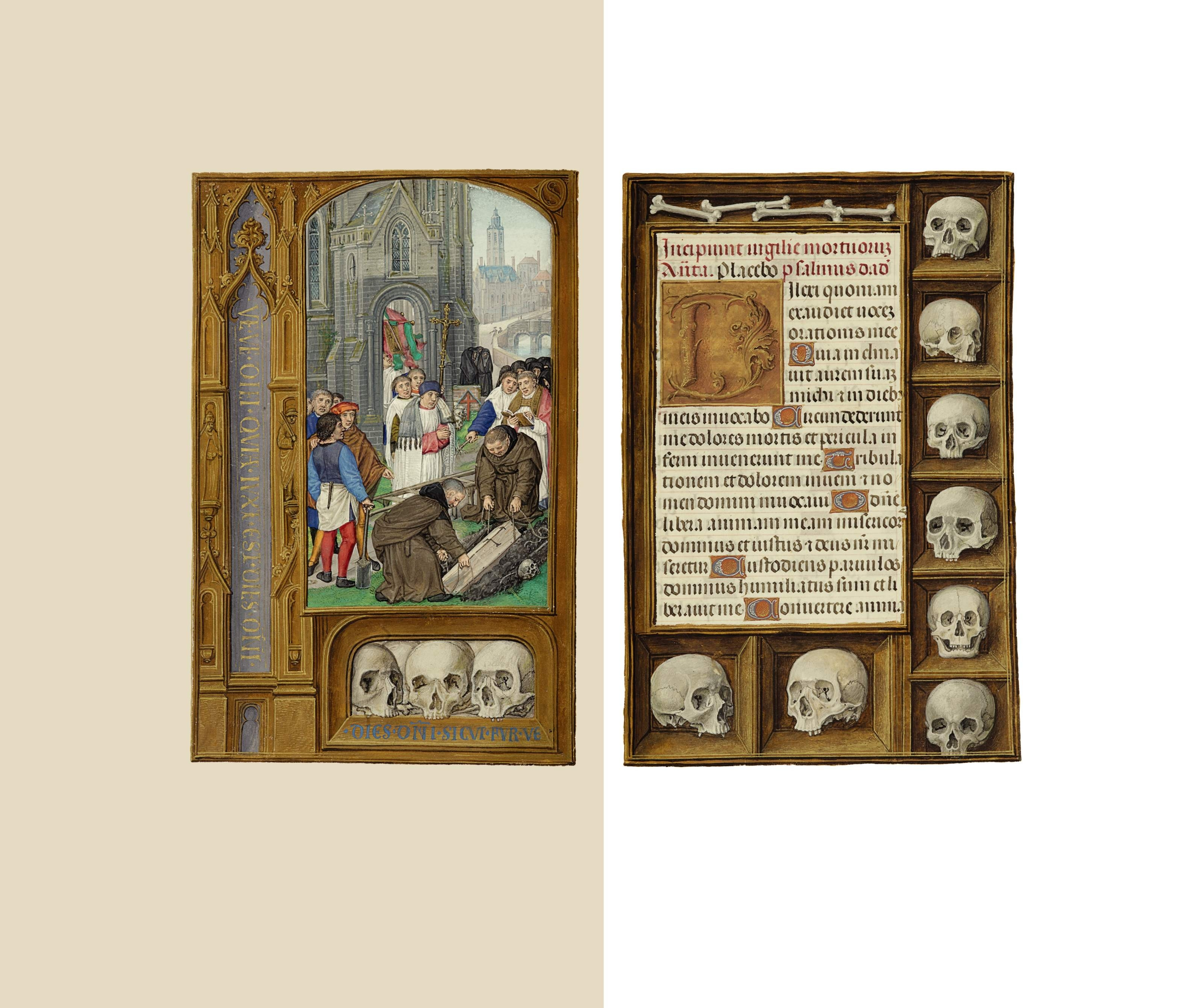

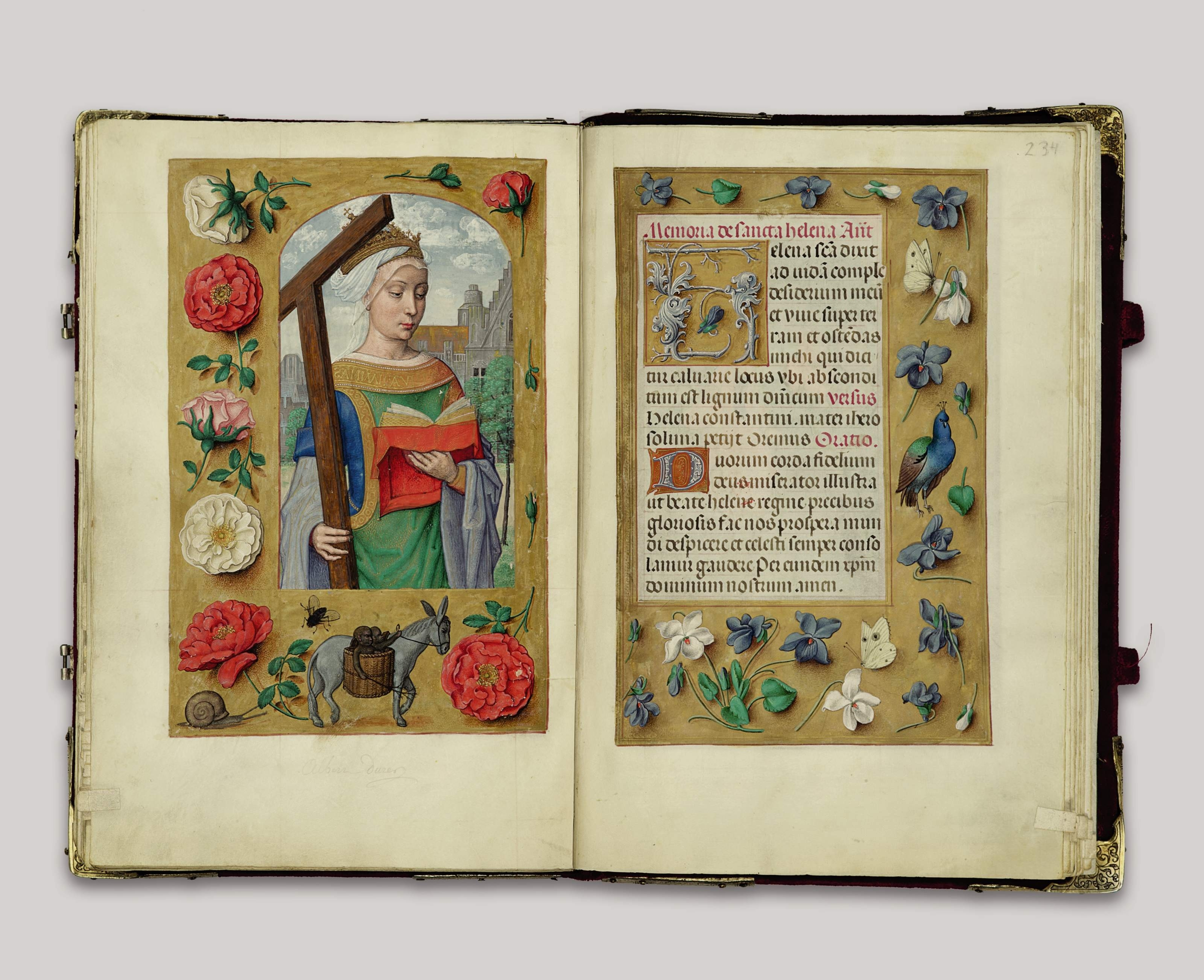

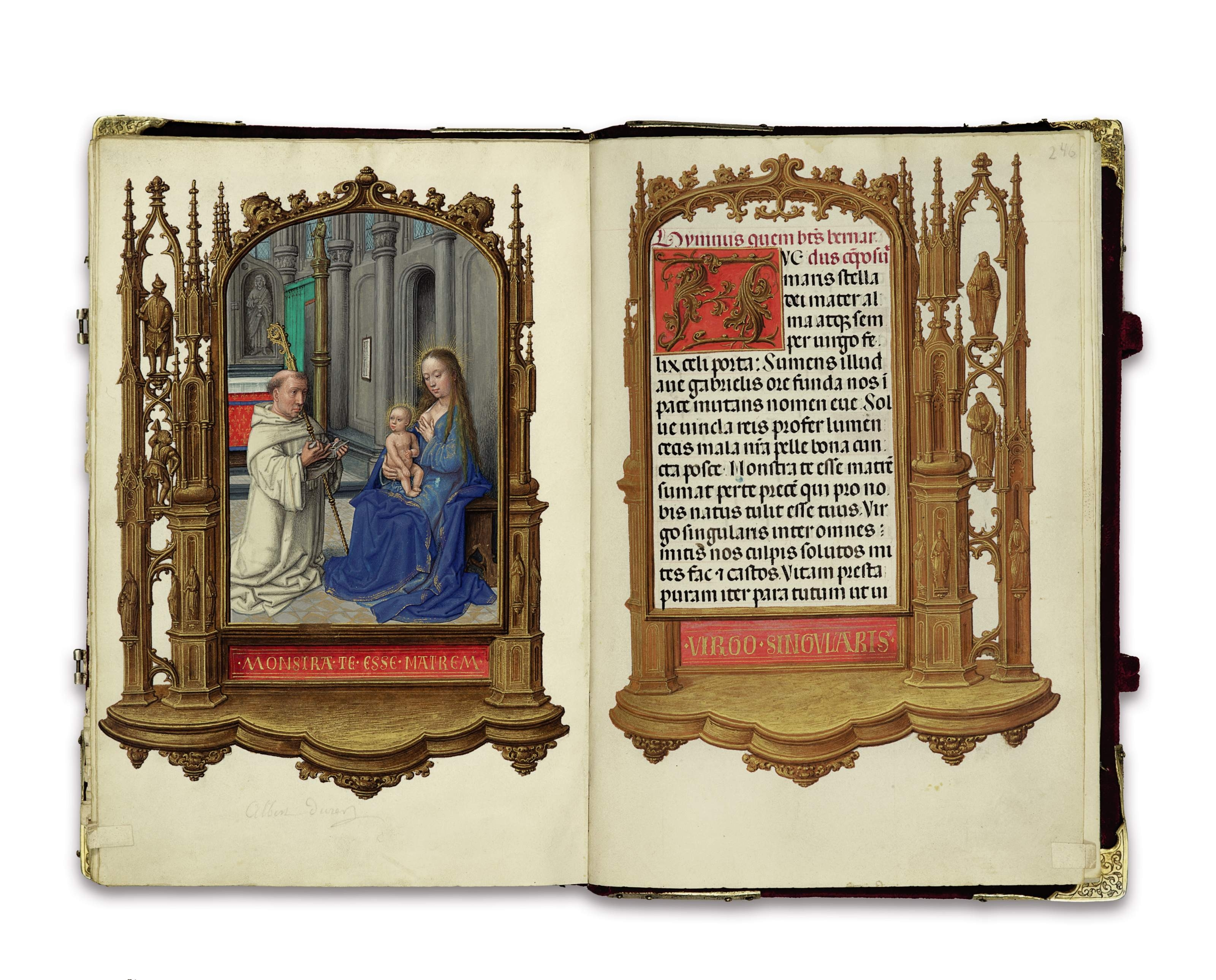

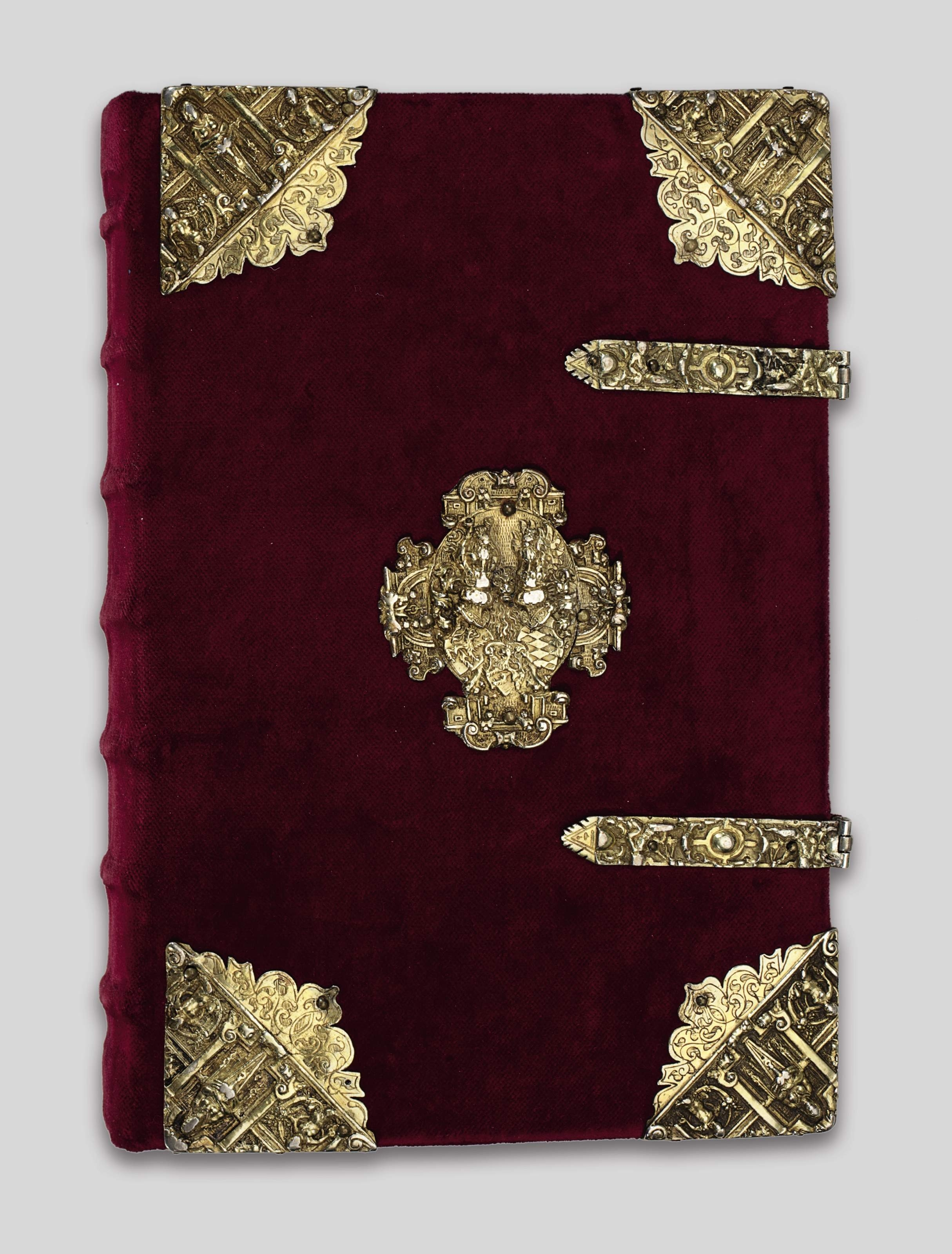

== See also ==
- List of most expensive books and manuscripts
