= Micky Benning =

English footballer and manager

Personal information
- Full name: Michael David Benning
- Date of birth: 3 February 1938
- Place of birth: Croxley Green, England
- Date of death: 25 November 2019 (aged 81)
- Position: Outside right

Youth career
- Watford Schools
- 1955: Luton Town
- 1955–1956: Croxley Boys Club

Senior career*
Years	Team	Apps	(Gls)
1956–1962	Watford	103	(14)
1962–1964	Cambridge City		
1964–196x	Bedford Town		
- Dunstable Town
1968–1970	Hatfield Town		
1970–19xx	Tudor Corinthians		
- Ambassadors

Managerial career
- Tudor Corinthians
- * Club domestic league appearances and goals

Michael David Benning (3 February 1938 – 25 November 2019) was an English football player who played most notably for Watford in The Football League before dropping down to play in the lower tiers of the English football league system, where he also managed for a spell.

== Career ==
Born in Croxley Green, Hertfordshire, Benning started his youth career as an amateur in the nearby area, with Watford Schools, Luton Town and Croxley Boys Club. He also joined Watford as an amateur in July 1956. He became semi-professional a few months later, retaining a part-time job in the print industry. Competing with full-time professionals for a place in the team, he did not make a single appearance under Neil McBain, the manager who signed him. Benning had to wait until Ron Burgess's first game in charge on 14 February 1959 for his debut; a 3–2 defeat to York City at Vicarage Road. He retained his place for Watford's next two matches.

Benning became a regular first-team player for Watford in 1959–60, missing the club's second league game of the season and their sole fixture in the Southern Floodlit Cup; only Cliff Holton played more matches. His first professional goal came on 12 September 1959 in a 6–0 win over Oldham Athletic. Watford finished the season in fourth position in the Football League Fourth Division, securing promotion to the Third Division. He was a regular in their first season in the division, as Watford again finished fourth. He faced increased competition in 1961–62, making only 18 of a possible 46 league appearances.

In July 1962, Benning joined Cambridge City of the Southern League. In his first season, he helped City win the league over their rivals Cambridge United. He left Cambridge City to join Bedford Town in 1964, before later playing for Hatfield Town, Tudor Corinthians (whom he also managed) and Ambassadors. As of 2009, Benning was running his own fireplace business.
