= Benning National Forest =

Former national forest in Georgia

Benning National Forest was established by the U.S. Forest Service in Georgia on October 3, 1924 with 78,560 acres (317.9 km^{2}) from Fort Benning. On December 2, 1927 the transfer was rescinded.
