= Alexander Bening =

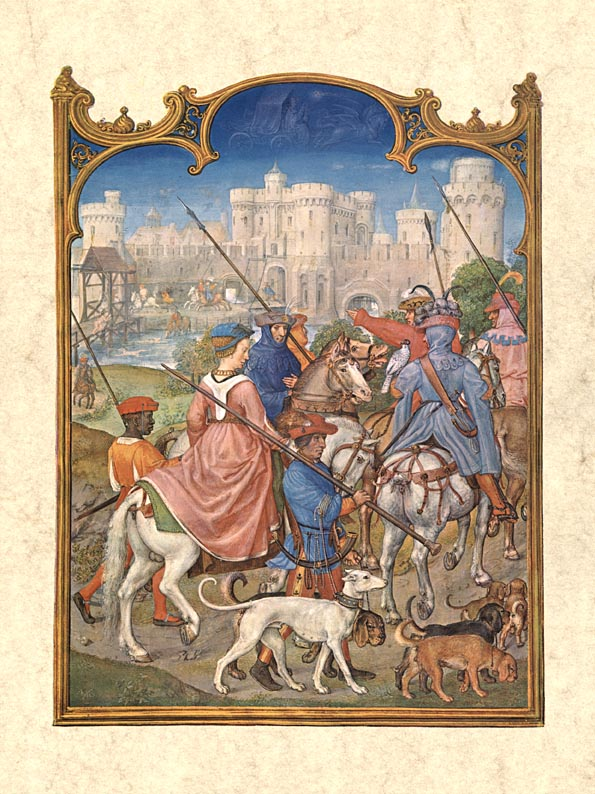
August by Alexander and Simon Bening, Biblioteca Marciana

Alexander Bening (died 1519), also Sanders Bening, was an early 16th-century miniature painter of the Ghent-Bruges school and Netherlandish tradition. His date of birth is unknown.

Bening was part of a South Netherlandish family of illuminators. He married Kathelijn van der Goes (probably a sister or niece of the painter Hugo van der Goes). Bening had two sons: Simon Bening, who was trained in his father's craft, and Paul Bening, whose profession is unknown.

No documented work is known by Bening. Records indicate in 1469 he became a member of the Guild of Saint Luke. Sanders and his family lived in Ghent, but in 1486 he also joined the Bruges Guild of St John and St Luke, whose membership embraced all those concerned with the production of books.

His daughter Cornelia married Andrew Halyburton, Conservator of Scottish privileges in the Netherlands. It has been suggested that Bening himself was related to a family of artists surnamed "Binning" working in Edinburgh later in the sixteenth century.

Some scholars identify the Master of the First Prayer Book of Maximilian with Alexander Bening.
