= Spinola Hours =

16th-century illuminated manuscript

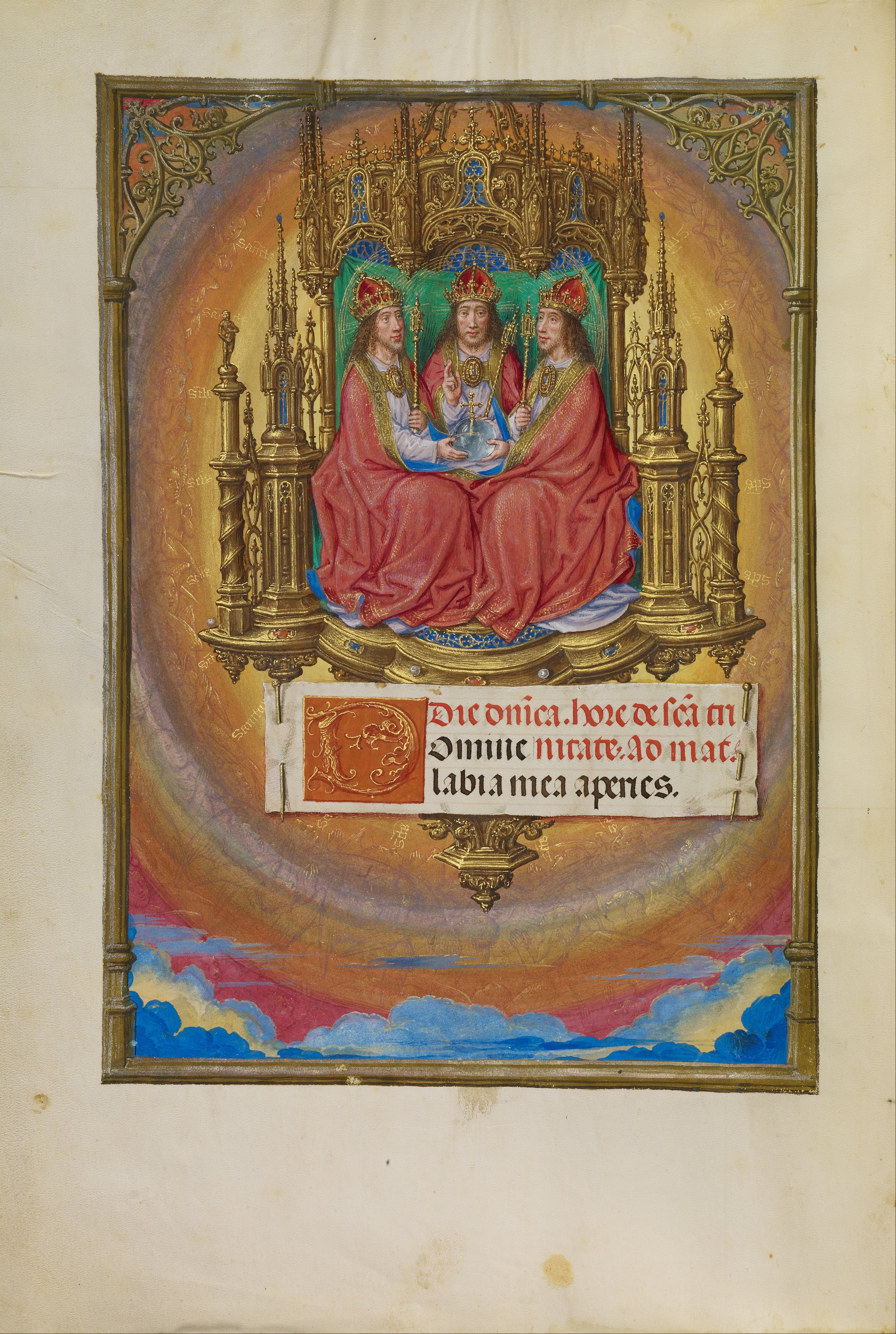
- The Holy Trinity Enthroned, fol. 10v.
- Artist: Master of James IV of Scotland; Master of the First Prayer Book of Maximilian; Master of the Lübeck Bible; Master of the Dresden Prayerbook; Master of the c. 1500 Prayerbook
- Year: c.1510–1520
- Medium: Tempera colors, gold, and ink on parchment
- Dimensions: 23.5 cm × 16.51 cm (9.3 in × 6.50 in)
- Location: J. Paul Getty Museum, Los Angeles

The Spinola Hours is an illuminated manuscript book of hours of about 1510-1520, consisting of 312 folios, over 80 of which are mainly decorated with miniature paintings. It was produced between Bruges and Ghent in Flanders around 1510-1520, and is a key work of the Ghent–Bruges school of illuminators. According to Thomas Kren, a former curator of the J. Paul Getty Museum, the miniatures within the Spinola Hours can be attributed to five distinct sources. Forty-seven of these illuminated pages can be attributed to the 'Master of James IV'. Since 1983 it has been in the J. Paul Getty Museum in Malibu, catalogued as Ms. Ludwig IX 18 (83.ML.114).

According to Thomas Kren and his colleagues, five distinct artists worked on the Spinola Hours, which Kren describes as "the most pictorially ambitious and original sixteenth-century Flemish manuscript". The last portion and perhaps the management of the project was by the Master of James IV of Scotland (of Ghent), usually thought to be the same person as the documented Gerard Hourenbout, whose notname comes from his participation in the Hours of James IV of Scotland, now in Vienna. He alone is credited for forty-seven of the illuminated pages. The other four artists are likely to have worked to his overall plan, in their own workshops. One or more artists from the workshop of the 'Master of the First Prayerbook of Maximilian' painted twenty-four miniatures, eight were credited to the 'Master of the Lübeck Bible', three to the 'Master of the Dresden Prayerbook', and two to the 'Master of the Prayer Books of around 1500', these two last of Bruges. No signs of collaboration on individual illuminations were identified in this manuscript.

== Provenance ==
The identity of the specific patron is still unknown. Margaret of Austria, daughter of Mary of Burgundy and Governor of the Habsburg Netherlands from 1507 to 1515, is one possibility, as some of the artists had worked for this major patron. Also the binding is similar to that of the Tres Riches Heures, which many scholars believe to have once belonged to her. In addition, Gerard Hourenbout, a court artist who illuminated the Sforza Hours and served under Margaret of Austria, was either the same person as, or was at least associated with, the Master of James IV.

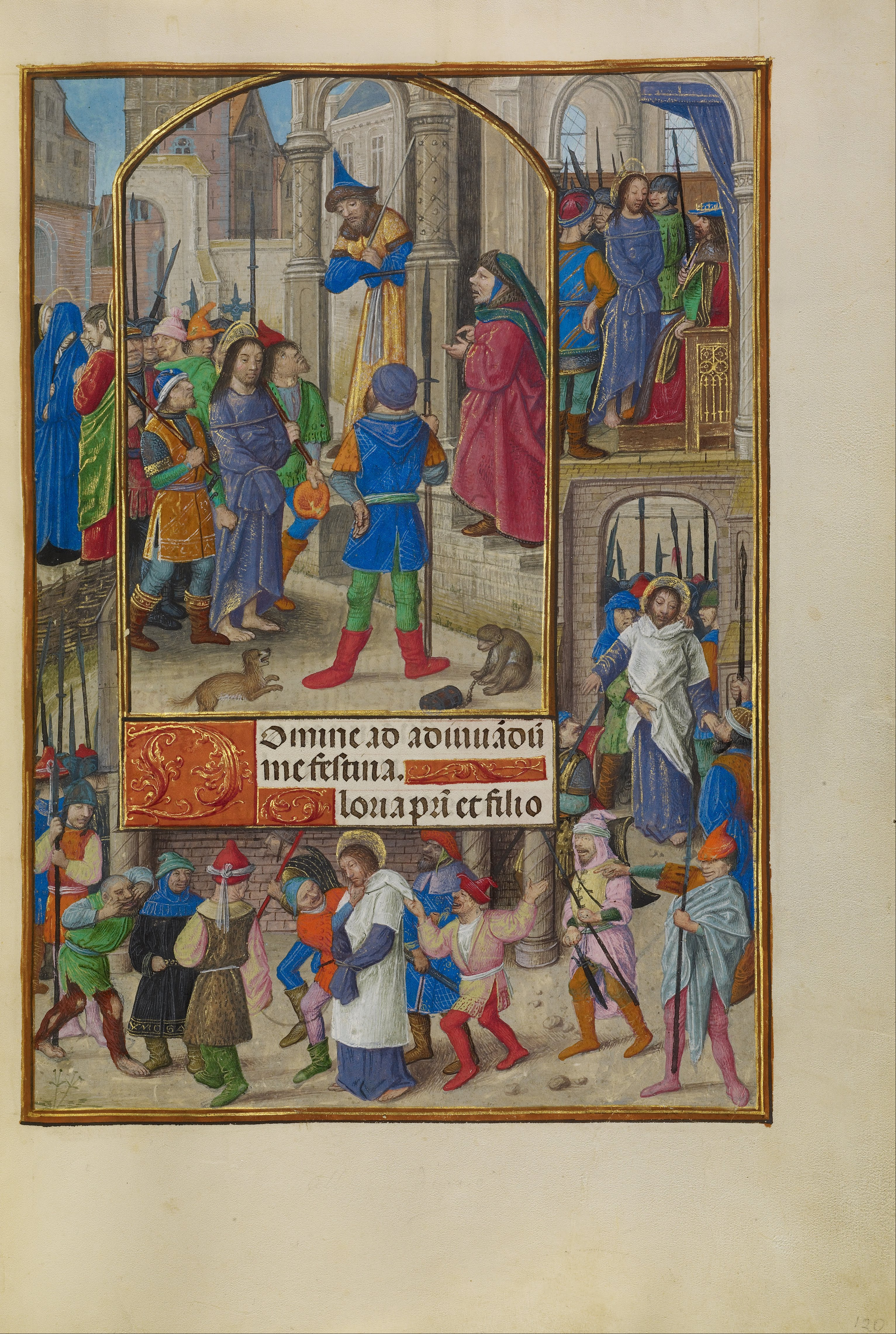
Christ before Caiaphas by the Master of the Dresden Prayerbook

The only unusual element in the text is the inclusion of a prayer written by the Medici Pope Leo X (f. 290v), who became pope in 1513 and died in 1521. It seems likely that the manuscript (which no doubt took several years to complete) largely dates from his reign, which does not conflict with other approaches to dating, such as the artists' careers.

Christiane Van den Bergen-Pantens suggested in 2000 that a coat-of-arms on f. 185 may be those of the Boussoit family (Bouswa in Dutch); Kren & McKendrick suggest these are not the same.

The 18th-century leather binding of the Spinola Hours has a central coat-of-arms indicating it then belonged to the Spinola family of Genoa, whose name it has retained. Ambrogio Spinola was the highly successful Captain-General of the Army of Flanders for the Spanish Habsburgs from 1603 to 1629, which might explain how it passed to them.

The book was in a private collection and "completely unknown" to specialists when it was put up for auction at Sotheby's on July 5, 1976. The Royal Library of Belgium was prepared to bid up to $500,000, but the dealer Hans P. Kraus secured it for $750,000 (£370,000), at the time "a staggering figure for such a late book of hours". In 1983, Dr. Peter Ludwig (1925-1996) and his wife Irene Ludwig (1927-2010) of Aachen and Cologne, chocolate billionaires and art collectors, purchased the Spinola Hours from H.P Kraus. Later that same year, the entire Ludwig collection was sold en bloc to the new J. Paul Getty Museum.

== Description ==
=== Materials and appearance ===
The Spinola Hours is larger than many other Books of Hours, consisting of ink on parchment with tempera colors and gold leaf. The manuscript is bound in eighteenth-century dark red leather with a gold floral border on both front and back covers. In the center of each cover is the coat-of-arms of the Spinola family of Genoa. (Both the Spinola Hours and the Tres Riches Heures share a nearly identical central coat-of-arms, but there is no connection between the two). The first three-quarters of the Spinola Hours reflect visible artistic consistency; however, anomalies in the gatherings and inconsistencies in border size start to appear closer towards the end of the book. The script used throughout the Spinola Hours is Gothic. Both red and gold coloring would be used to emphasize a particular text.

=== Text ===
In addition to the fairly invariable texts for a book of hours, such as the Hours of the Virgin and the Office for the Dead, there is a "special series of weekday offices and masses", mostly illustrated by images including those of saints such as Saint Francis of Asissi. The prayer by Pope Leo X is very unusual, if not unique, perhaps mainly included as an act of diplomacy.

=== Illuminations ===
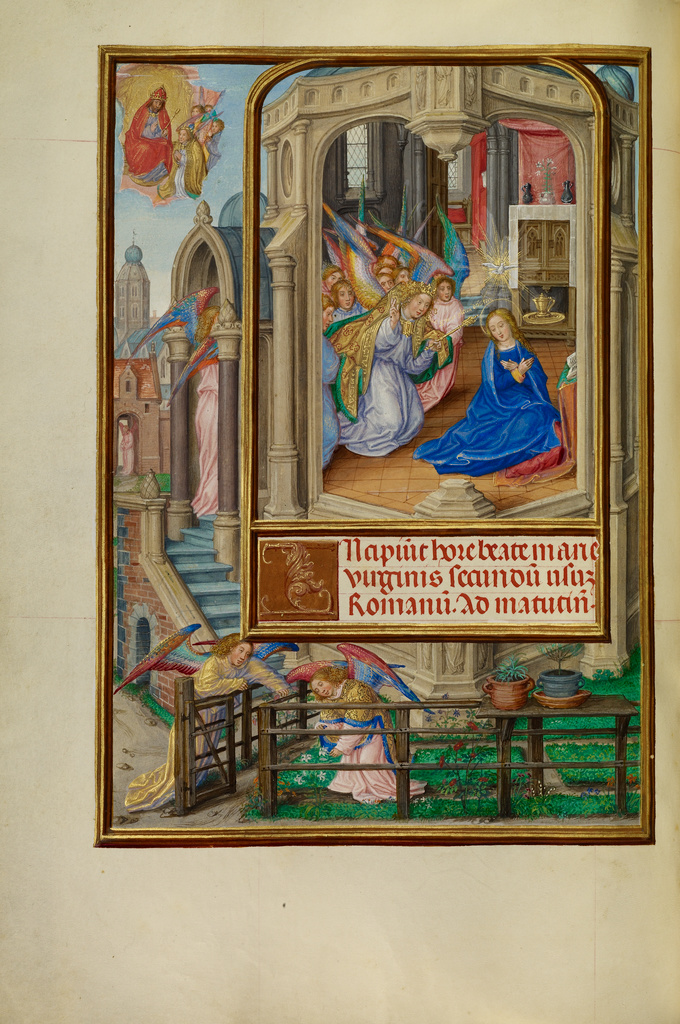
The Annunciation (Fol. 92v) by Master of James IV

Some of the borders framing the text pages imitate carved wood or textiles, but most have the usual flowers, berries, and insects, here very carefully depicted. Some of the pages with large miniatures use this style (for example The Stigmatization of Saint Francis illustrated below), but many use the Ghent-Bruges school style of different narrative images in "windows". In some cases these show different aspects of the same episode; in others the scenes are on the face of it showing completely different incidents, and their connection is more subtle. There is only one full-page miniature with no text in it in the manuscript; this is Saint John the Baptist Preaching (fol. 276v).

The Master of James IV of Scotland is attributed the first 14 pages of the Weekday Hours, with pairs of illuminated pages facing each other. Many of the borders and decor surrounding the miniatures can be credited to him as well; these borders apparently acted as the base example for the other four artists. He, probably with help from his workshop, also produced the calendar pages. These have several different parts: at the bottom a wide scene showing the relevant Labour of the Month, below the "window" with the actual calendar, then along one side a set of roundels with small scenes in color illustrating the notable feats of the month, and at bottom a roundel with an image of the relevant sign of the Zodiac, which is named below. Down the opposite side of the page, a narrow field in grisaille has statue-like figures of saints and architectural decoration. Along the top of the page, a band with small brown grisaille figures, with gold highlighting, occupy themselves with games and sports.

The artists from the workshop of the Master of the First Prayerbook of Maximilian made the second largest contribution to the miniatures in the book, creating twenty-four. Thomas Kren sorts his figures into two categories, the first set of figures are identified as primarily female saints. There were more distinct pink tones in the skin, large broad heads, and exhibited no gray undertones often found in his illuminations. The second set is made up of primarily male saints and includes Evangelist portraits, The Last Judgement (fol. 165v), Saint John the Baptist Preaching (fol. 276v), as well as the illustrations to various accessory texts.

The Master of the Dresden Prayerbook painted openings for lauds and prime (fols. 119v-120) of the Hours of the Virgin. The Mocking of Christ in the border surrounding Christ before Caiaphas is also attributed to him.

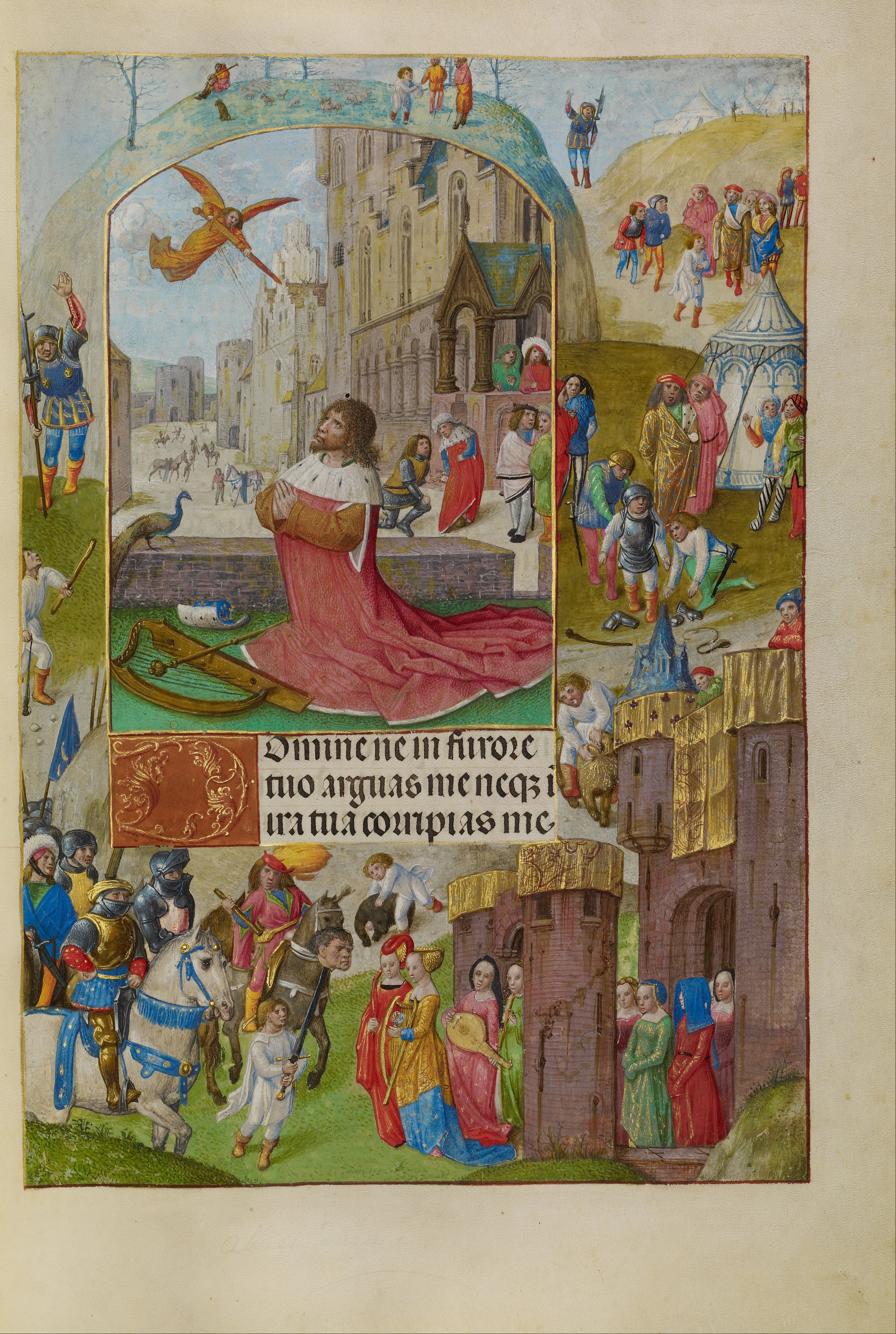
Master of the Lübeck Bible, Scenes from the life of King David

The Master of the Lübeck Bible is most known for his distinctive figures, as they were smaller in comparison to other figures done by the other artists. The faces, while still expressive, are less detailed and shown to be in a loose technique.

The Master of the Prayer Books of around 1500, was perhaps based in Bruges. Normally known for his genre scenes of everyday life, his pair of miniatures in the Spinola Hours (fols. 125–126) follow the style of the book, with the landscape in 'The Adoration of the Shepherds continued in another "window" beside it.

==== The Annunciation ====
The Hours of the Virgin Mary is a principal text in the Spinola Hours; unlike many other book of hours where the leading text is presented during the beginning, it does not begin until a third of the way into the book. The Annunciation (fol. 92v) illustrated by the Master of James IV, showcases a framed panel in a special red text "incipiu[n]t hore beate marie virginis secundu[m] usu[m] Romanu[m]. Ad matutin[as]", 'Beginning the Hours of the Blessed Virgin Mary, according to the usage of Rome. Matins'.

==== Holy Trinity Enthroned ====
The Holy Trinity Enthroned (fol.10v) is one of the earliest fully painted illustrations featured in the Spinola Hours by the Master of James IV. Each of the three figures is distinguishable from the waist up but share only one robe, this symbolism is part of the Christian belief that Trinity is made up of three persons and one substance. Red encased text identifies the following text as the prayer of Matins of the Hours of the Holy Trinity, naturally to be read on Sunday. The black text begins with a line from Psalm 50: "Domine labia mea aperies", 'Lord, open my lips'.

== Gallery ==
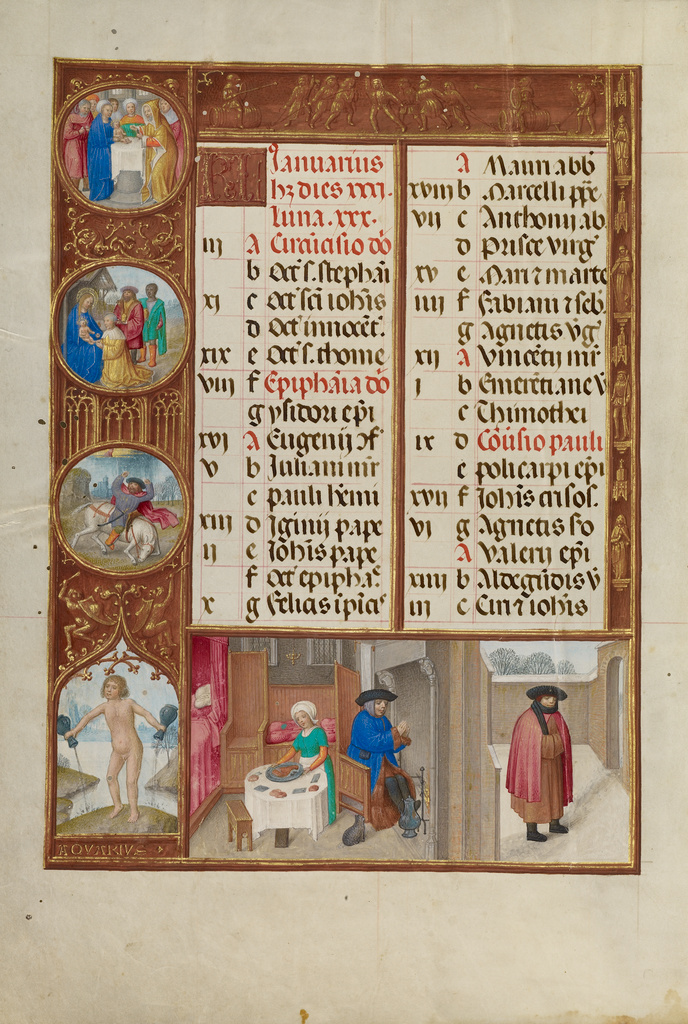
January Calendar Page; Feasting and Warming; Zodiacal Sign of Aquarius by Master James IV

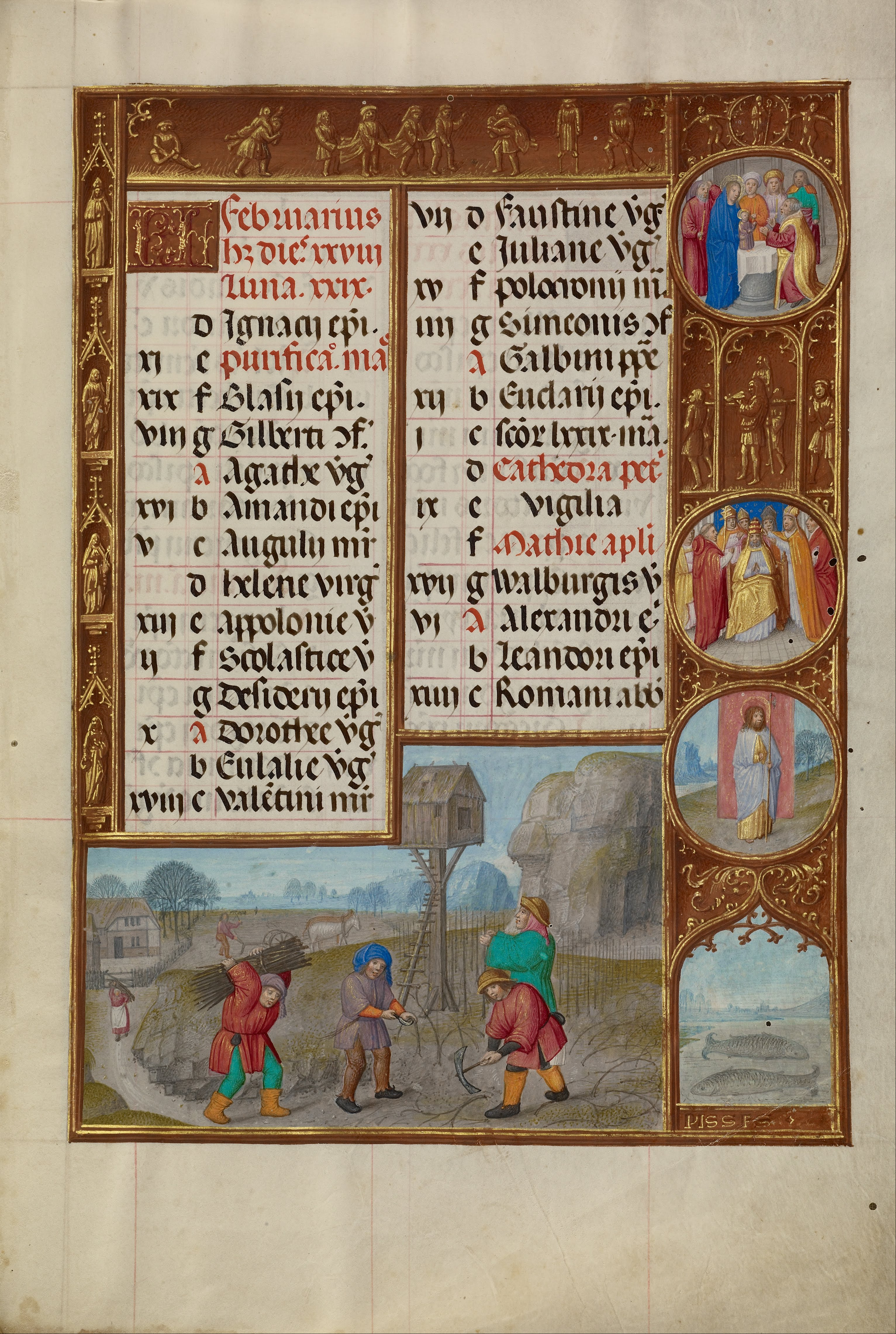
February Calendar Page; Working in a Vineyard; Zodiacal Sign of Pisces by Master of James IV

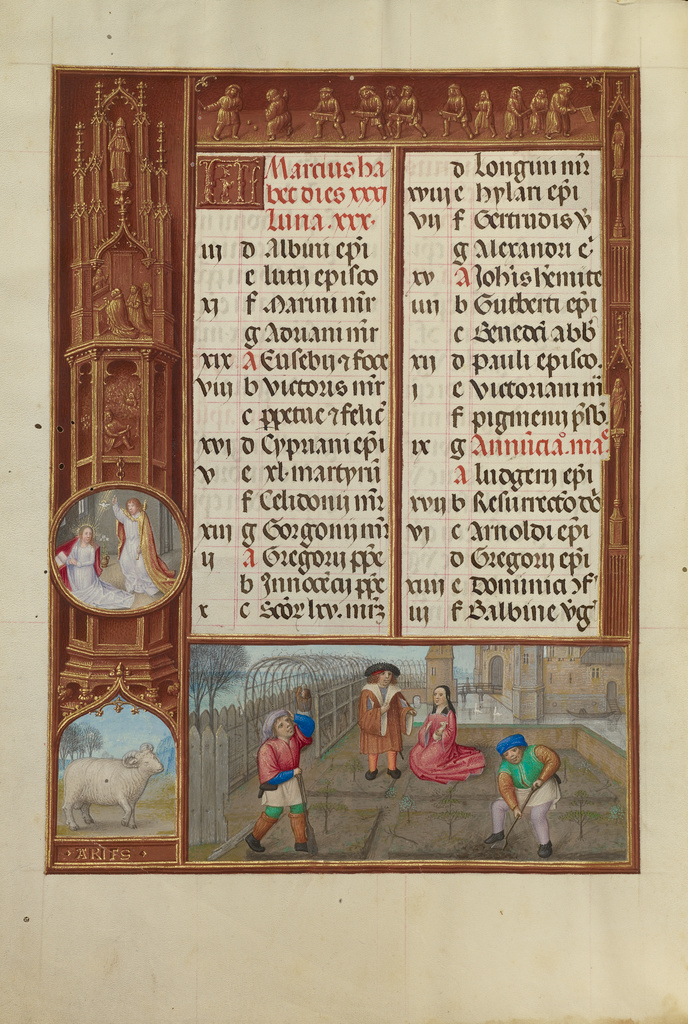
March Calendar Page; Gardening; Zodiacal Sign of Aries by Master of James IV

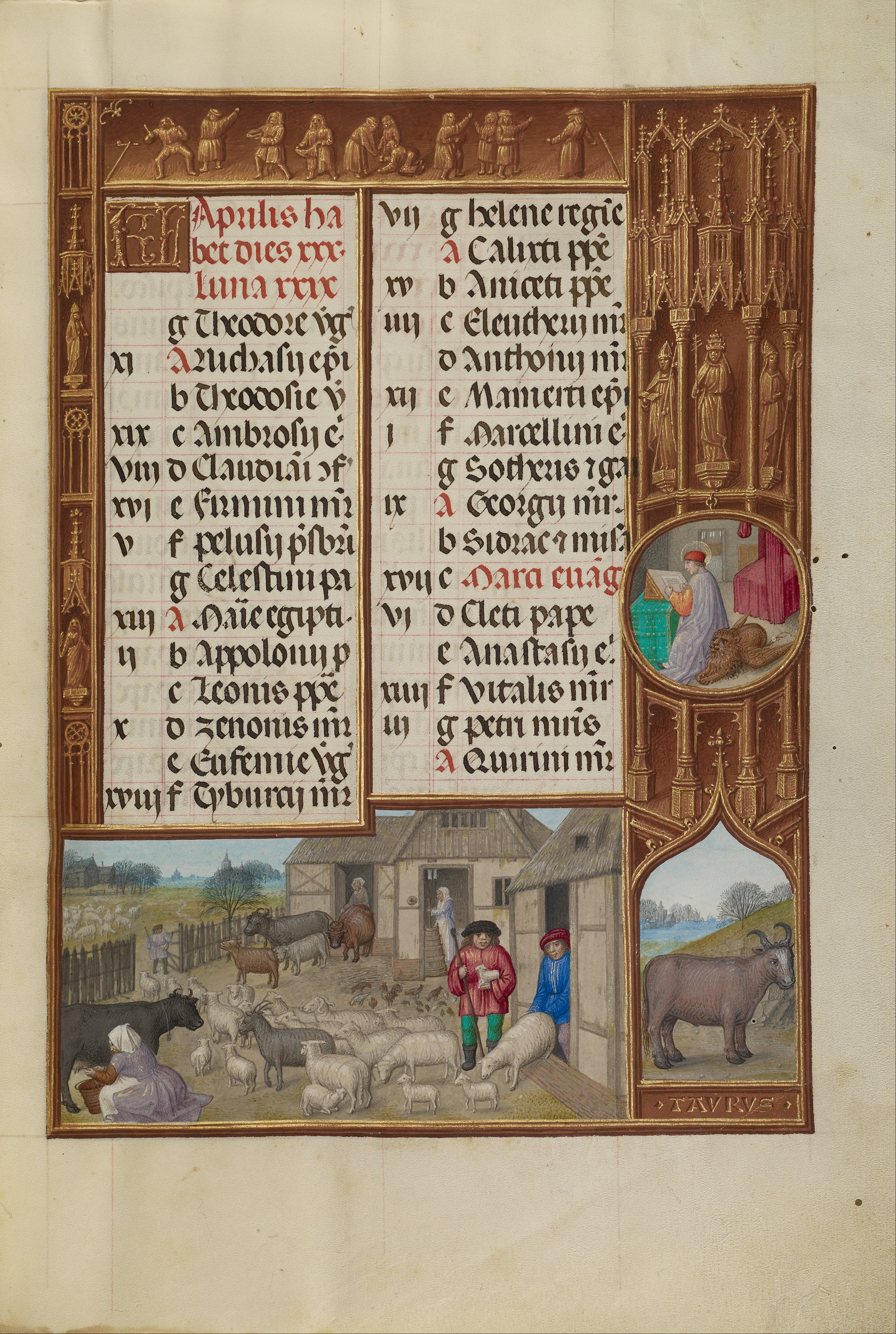
April Calendar Page;Milking and Butter Making; Zodiacal Sign of Taurus by Master of James IV

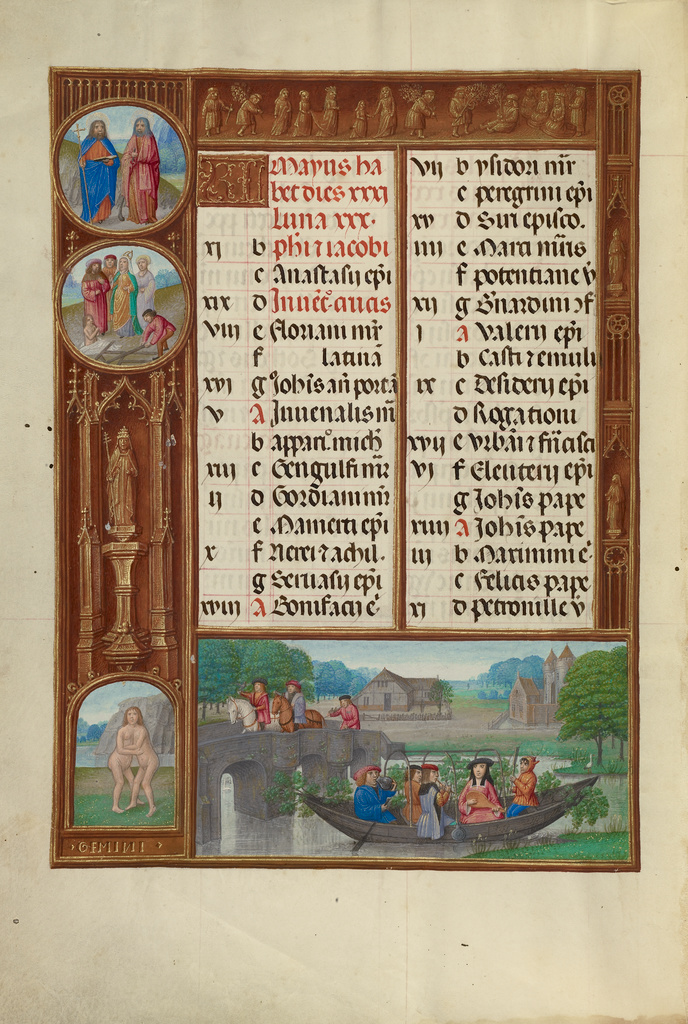
May Calendar Page; Music Making; Zodiacal Sign of Gemini by Master of James IV

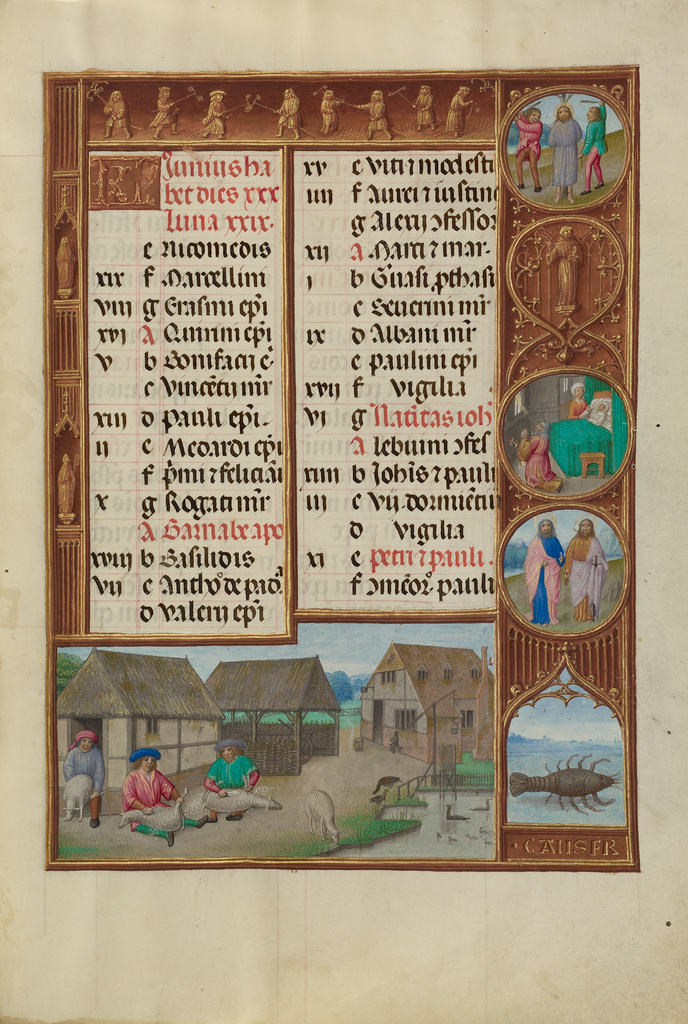
June Calendar Page; Sheepshearing; Zodiacal Sign of Cancer by Master of James IV

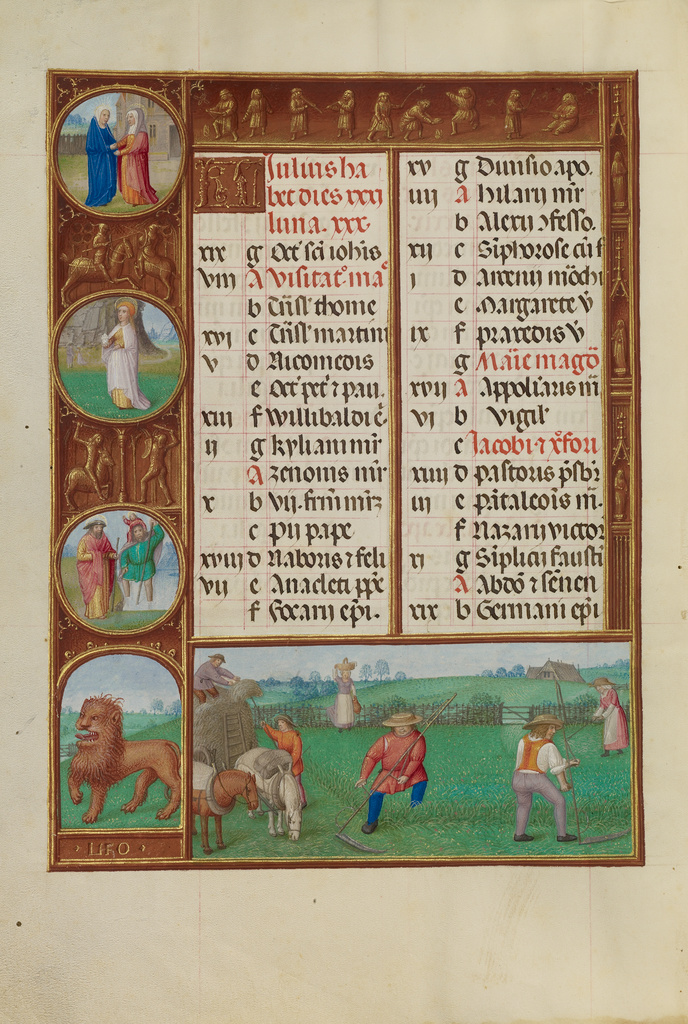
July Calendar Page; Mowing; Zodiacal Sign of Leo by Master James IV

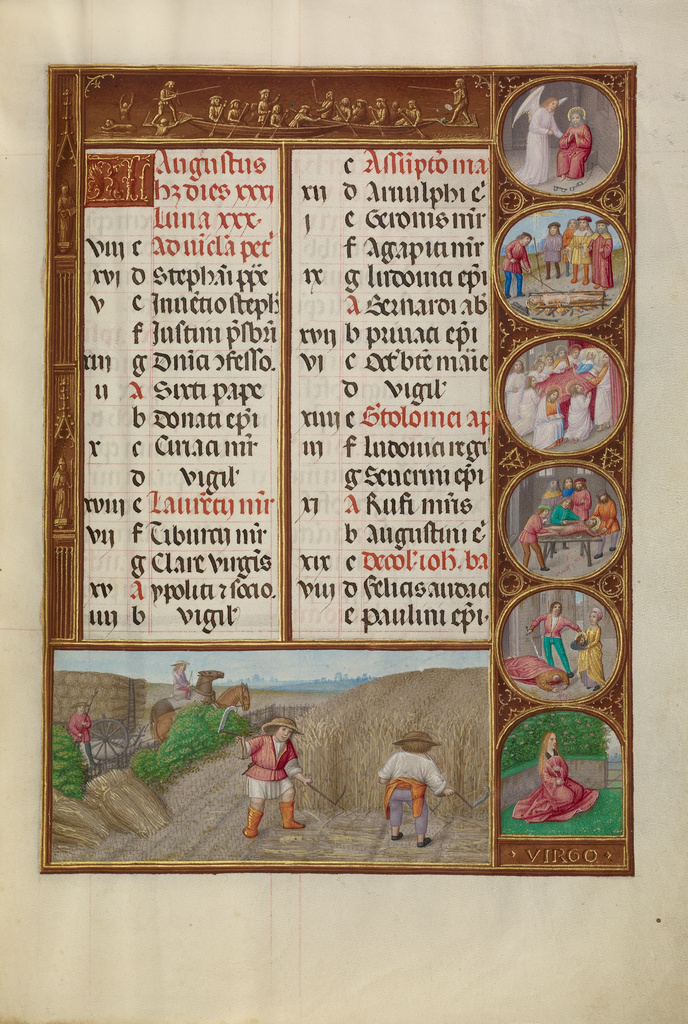
August Calendar Page; Reaping; Zodiacal Sign of Virgo by Master of James IV

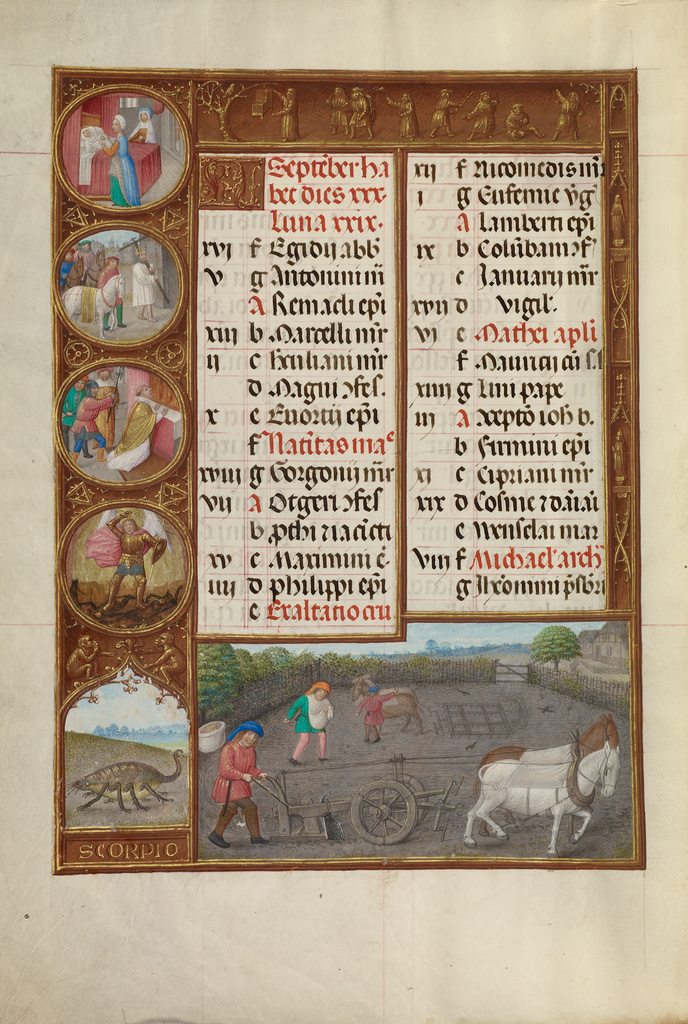
September Calendar Page; Plowing and Sowing; Zodiacal Sign of Scorpio by Master of James IV

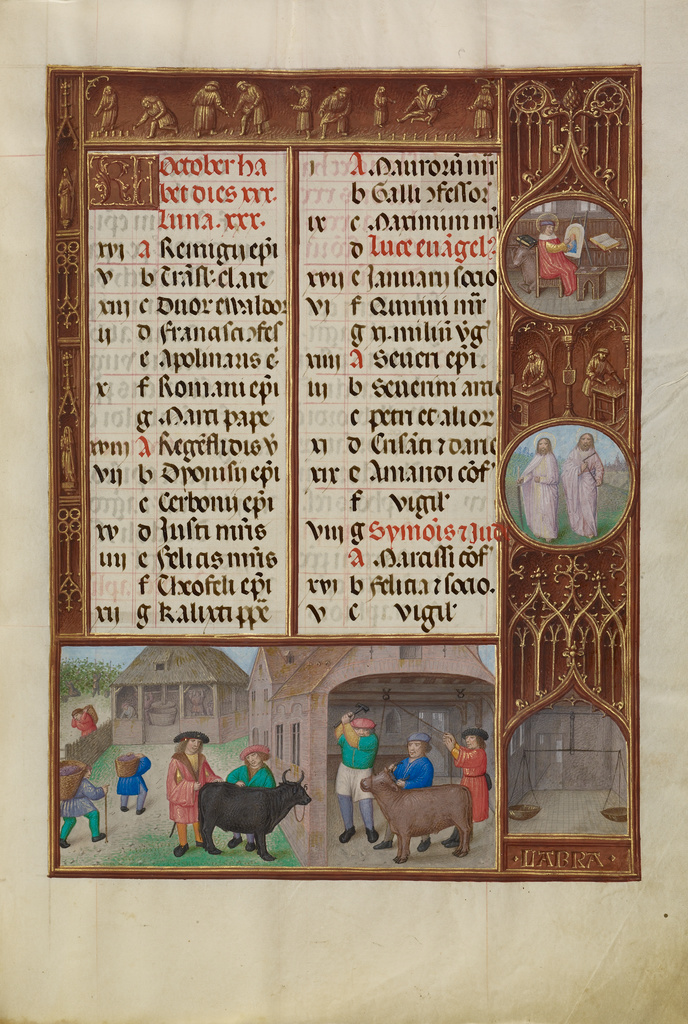
October Calendar Page; Slaughtering and Ox and Grape Harvesting; Zodiacal Sign of Libra by Master of James IV

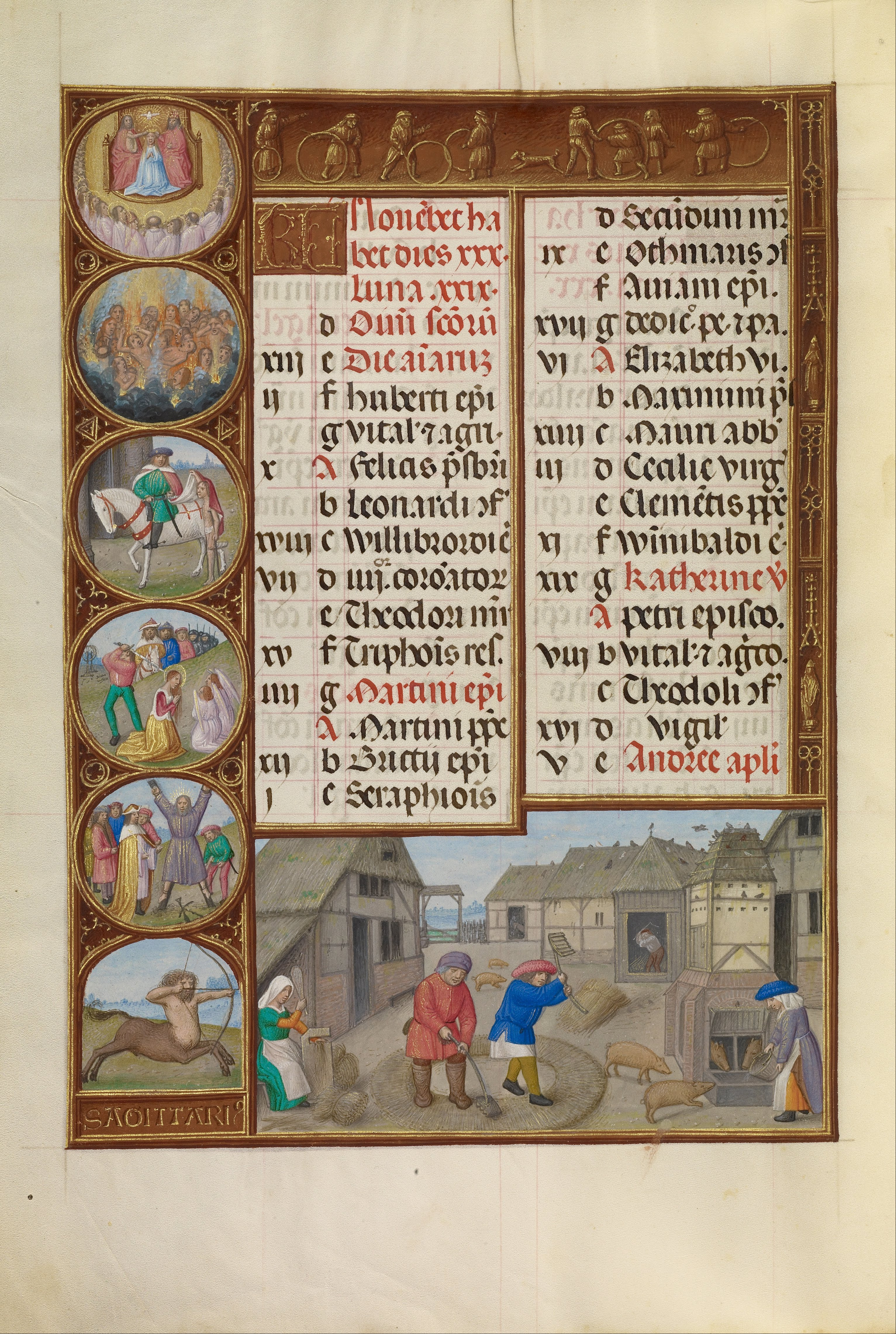
November Calendar Page; Threshing and Pig Feeding; Zodiacal Sign of Sagittarius by Master of James IV

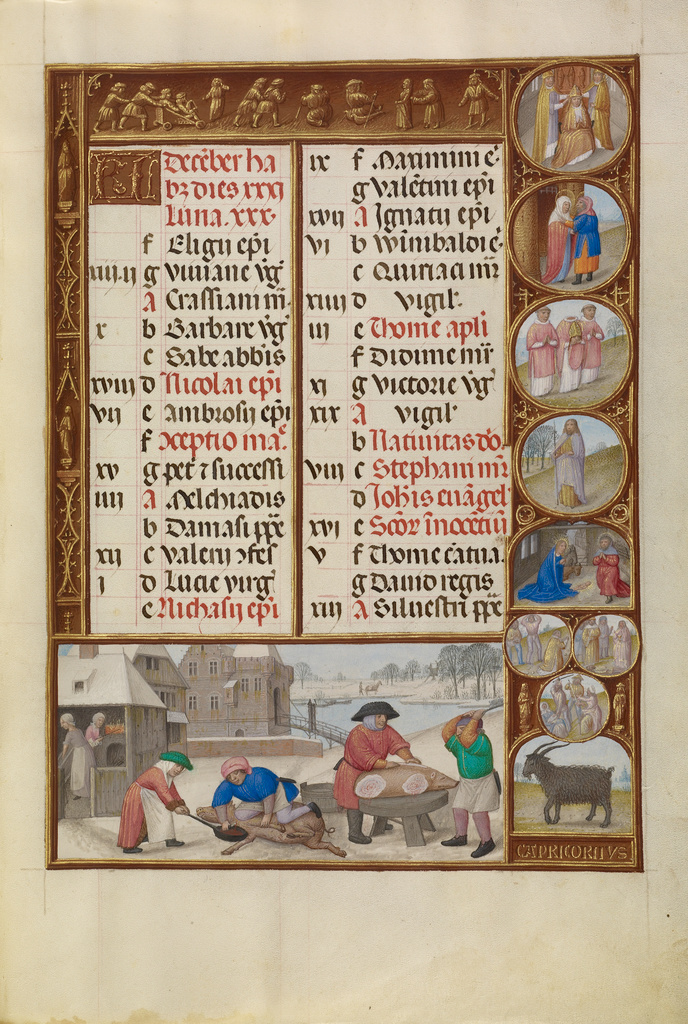
December Calendar Page; Slaughtering Pigs; Zodiacal Sign of Capricorn by Master of James IV

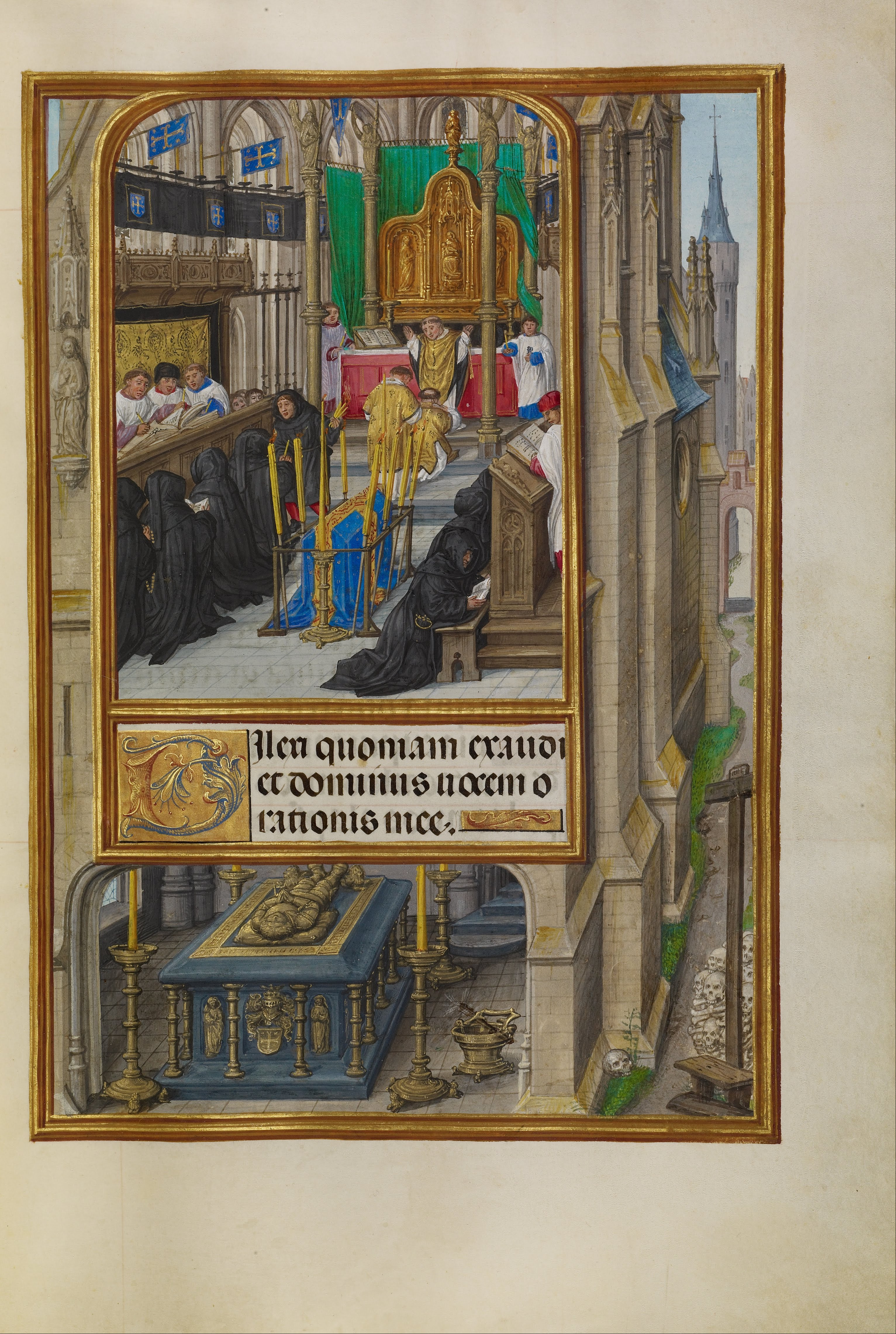
Office of the Dead by Master of James IV

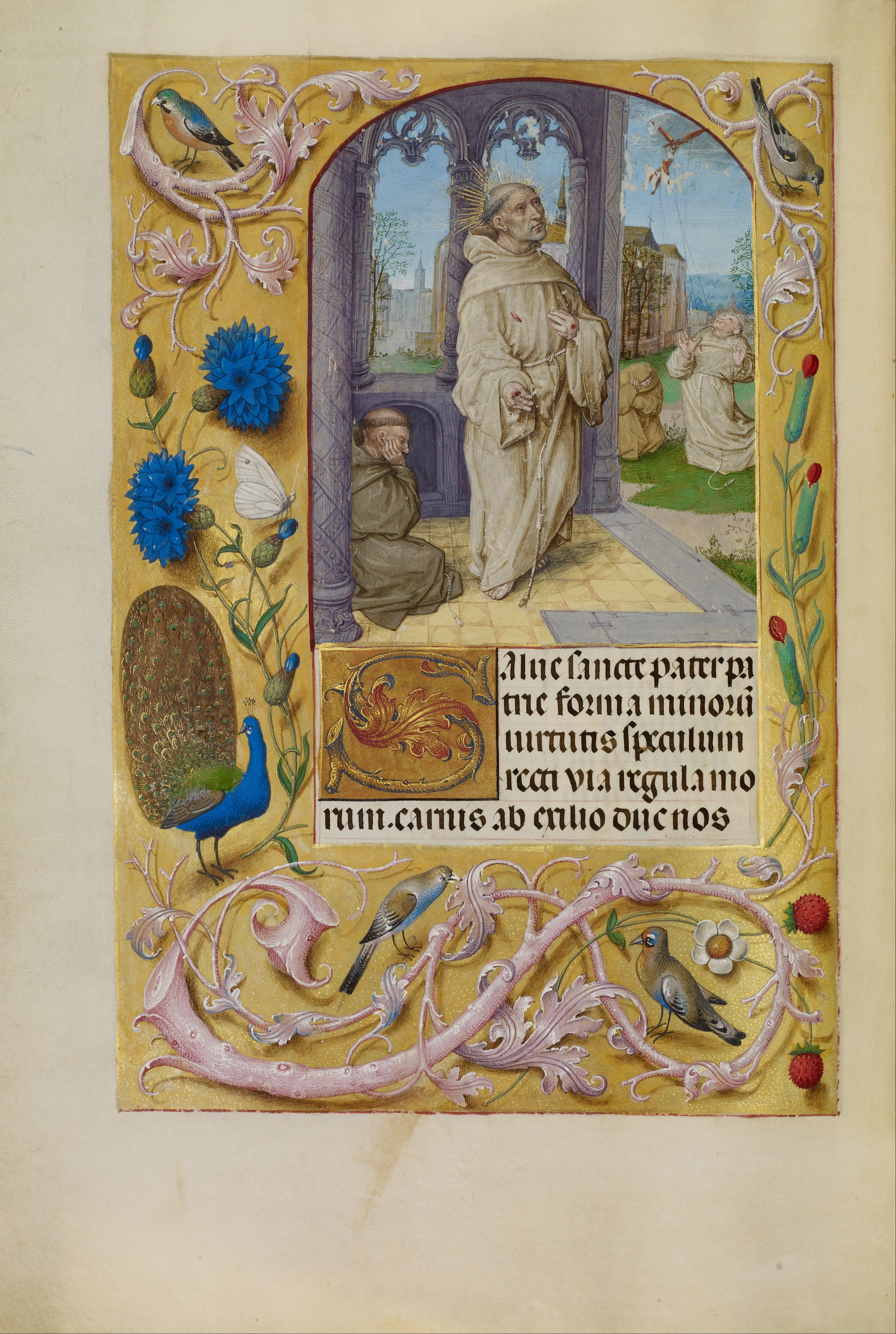
The Stigmatization of Saint Francis by the Master of the Lübeck Bible.
