= Breviary of Eleanor of Portugal =

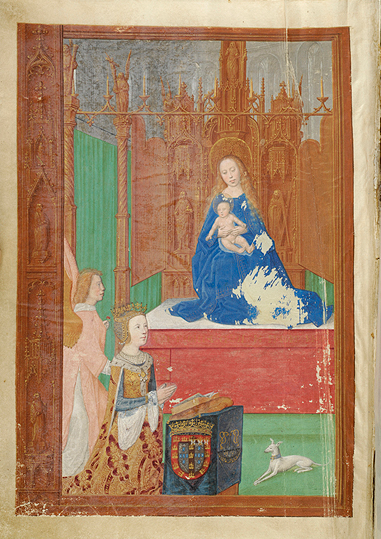
Frontispiece of the Breviary, depicting Eleanor of Viseu in prayer before a prie-dieu draped with her personal arms and device

The Breviary of Eleanor of Portugal is an early 16th-century Flemish illuminated manuscript Breviary, providing the divine office according to the Roman ordinal and calendar.

It contains the work of several leading miniaturists of the Ghent-Bruges school of Flemish illumination. The "Master of the First Prayer Book of Maximilian" seems to have led the team of artists that produced the codex, which included the Master of James IV of Scotland (who some scholars identify with Gerard Horenbout, court artist to Margaret of Austria), who painted many of the historiated borders, the calendar, as well as the small miniatures in the Ferial Psalter, and the Master of the Prayerbooks of c. 1500 or an artist in his circle. Lesser hands, probably assistants to the Maximilian Master, can also be identified.

The breviary belonged originally to Eleanor, Queen of Portugal, who is depicted in prayer before the Virgin and Child in the opening miniature; it is not known, however, whether it was commissioned by the Queen herself, or whether it was a gift to her, (perhaps through the Netherlandish Hapsburg court, by Emperor Maximilian I or Margaret of Austria). It was purchased by J. P. Morgan from the Parisian art dealer Hamburger Frères in 1905: it is now in the collection of the Morgan Library & Museum, in New York.
