= Master of the Houghton Miniatures =

Flemish manuscript illuminator

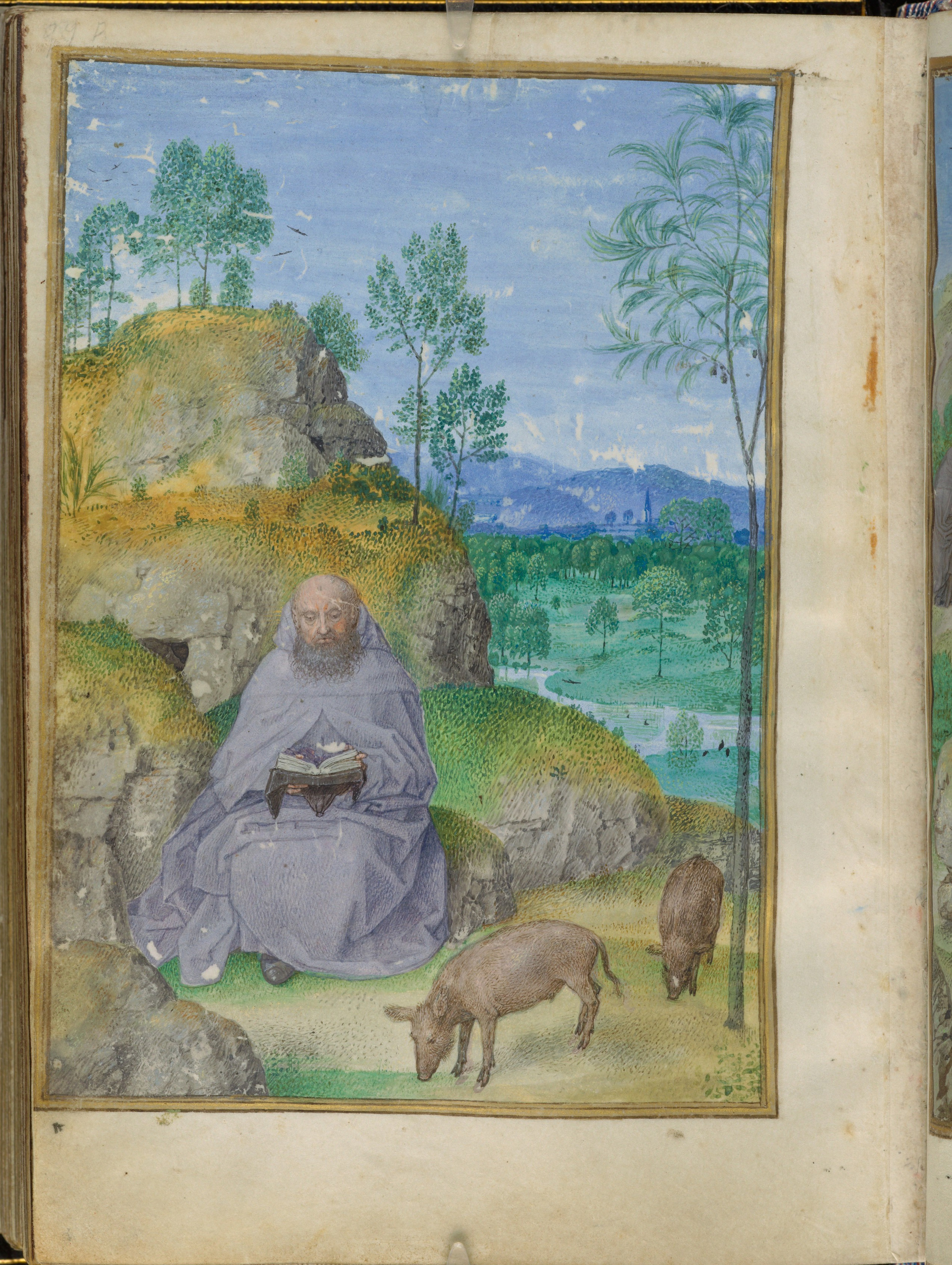
Saint Anthony, Emerson-White Hours, f. 99^{v}.

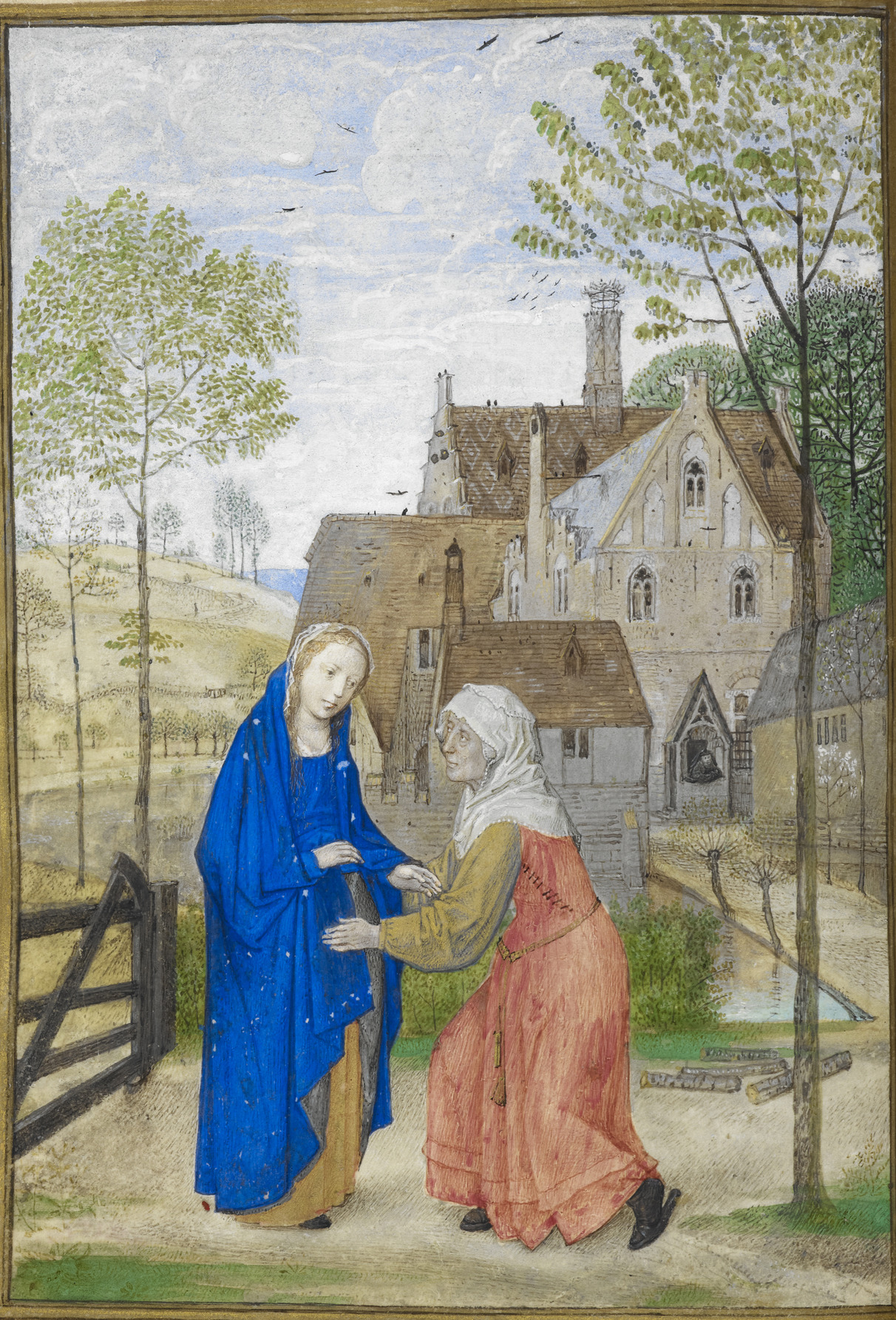
The Visitation, Huth Hours, f. 66^{v}.

The Master of the Houghton Miniatures is the conventional name of an illuminator probably active in Ghent between 1476 and 1480. He owes his name to a book of hours that he illuminated, currently kept in the Houghton Library at Harvard University.

== Biographical notes ==
His works have for a long time been confused with those of the Viennese Master of Mary of Burgundy. It was the art historian Thomas Kren who proposed in 2003 to distinguish four miniatures in a book of hours kept at the Houghton Library. The few miniatures attributed to him appear in collaborations with Simon Marmion but there is little connection with the illumination common in Hainaut at that time. He seems to have been quite active in Ghent around 1480 and his style is reminiscent of Hugo van der Goes' art. This similarity has led people to say that the Master of the Houghton Miniatures was probably one of his close collaborators or assistants, or even Goes himself. The latter having died in 1482, there is no chronological objection to this.

== Style ==
The artist's style is marked by very precise and detailed landscapes in his miniatures. The drawing of his characters is just as precise, paying attention to all the details of the face and hair, as shown in particular by a drawing undoubtedly by the same artist kept in Berlin. He also shows an attachment to the representation of animals stretching their torsos. His art is similar to that of the Viennese Master of Mary of Burgundy but is distinguished by rounder characters, with strong noses, deep-set eyes, and high cheekbones which recall those of Hugo van der Goes.

== Attributed works ==
- The Emerson-White Hours, 4 miniatures by the master in collaboration with Simon Marmion, the Master of the Dresden Prayerbook, the Ghent Associates and other anonymous artists, before 1482, Houghton Library, MS Typ 443.
- The Huth Hours, 2 miniatures by the master, in collaboration with Simon Marmion, the Master of the Dresden Prayerbook, the Ghent Associates and other anonymous artists, early 1480s, British Library, Add MS 38126.
- Two isolated miniatures taken from a devotional book, c. 1480: David in Prayer, and The Vision of Saint Dominic.
- Fourteen heads, drawing on paper, Kupferstichkabinett Berlin, KDZ 12512.
