= Enguerrand de Monstrelet =

15th-century French chronicler

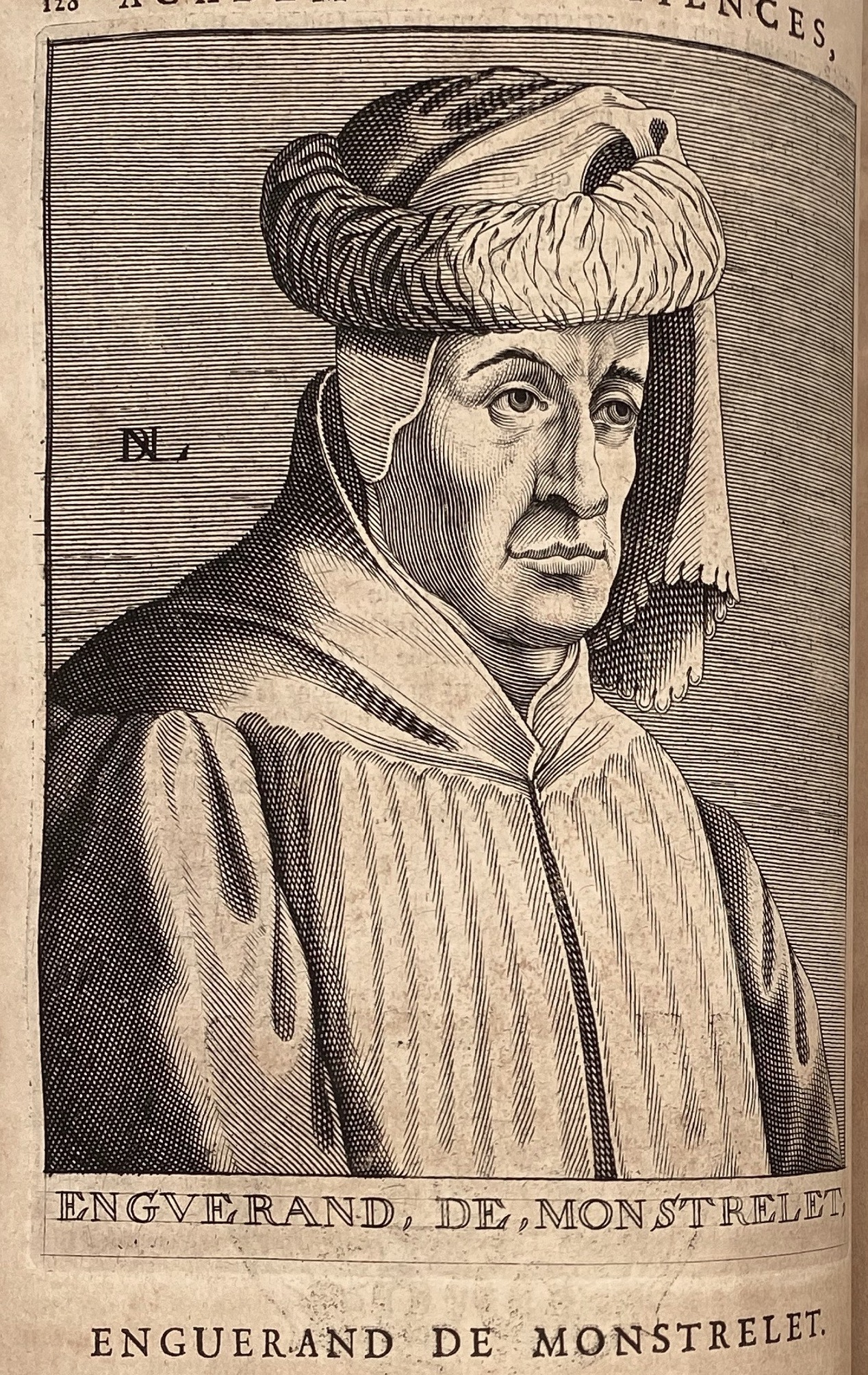
Enguerrand de Monstrelet

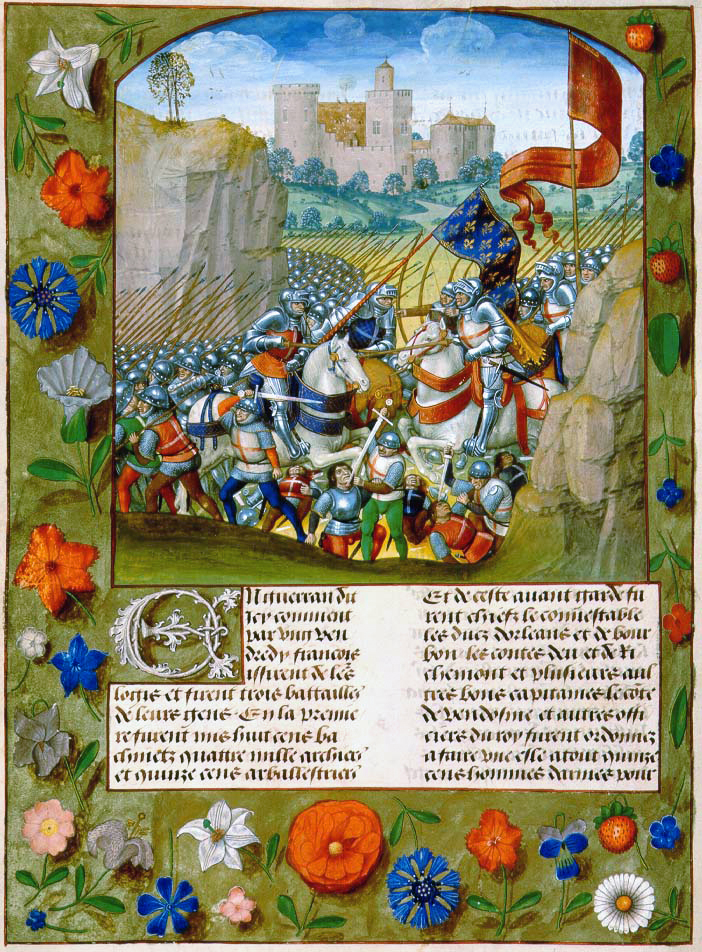
The Battle of Agincourt from Enguerrand de Monstrelet's Chronique de France, shown in a miniature by Master of the Prayer Books of around 1500

Enguerrand de Monstrelet (c. 1400 – 20 July 1453) was a French chronicler. He was born in Picardy, most likely into a family of the minor nobility.

== Life ==
In 1436 and later he held the office of lieutenant of the gavenier (i.e. receiver of the gave, a kind of church rate) at Cambrai, and he seems to have made this city his usual place of residence. He was for some time bailiff of the cathedral chapter and then provost of Cambrai. He was married and left some children when he died.

Little else is known about Monstrelet except that he was present, not at the capture of Joan of Arc, but at her subsequent interrogation with Philip the Good, Duke of Burgundy. Continuing the work of Froissart, Monstrelet wrote a Chronique, which extends to two books and covers the period between 1400 and 1444, when, according to another chronicler, Mathieu d'Escouchy, he ceased to write. In these can be found his commentary on the Battle of Tannenberg (1410) between the Teutonic Order and the Polish-Lithuanian and allied armies, where he stated that the King of Poland "had just recently pretended to become a Christian in order to win the Polish Crown". But following a custom which was by no means uncommon in the Middle Ages, a clumsy sequel, extending to 1516, was formed out of various chronicles and tacked onto his work.

Monstrelet's own writings, dealing with the latter part of the Hundred Years' War, are valuable because they contain a large number of authentic documents and reported speeches. The author, however, shows little power of narration; his work, although clear, is dull. His somewhat ostentatious assertions of impartiality do not cloak a marked preference for the Burgundians in their struggle with France.

Among many editions of the Chronique may be mentioned those of J.-A. Buchon (1826) and the one edited for the Société de I'histoire de France by M Doüet-d'Arcq (Paris, 1857–1862). See Auguste Molinier, Les Sources de I'histoire de France, vols. IV and V (Paris, 1904).

== Works ==
- Doüet-d'Arcq, L., ed. (1857). Chroniques d'Enguerrand de Monstrelet: en deux livres, avec pièces justificatives. Collection des chroniques nationales françaises (nouvelle ed.). Paris: Mme. Ve J. Renouard.
  - Tome 1 1857
  - Tome 2 1858
  - Tome 3 1859
  - Tome 4 1860
  - Tome 5 1861
  - Tome 6 1862
