= Gerard Horenbout =

Flemish miniaturist (c. 1465 – c. 1541)

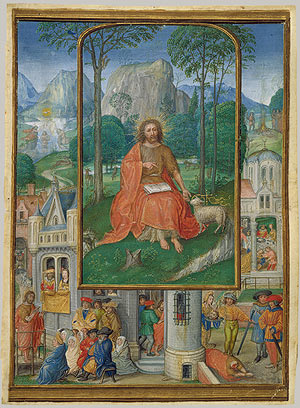
Saint John the Baptist, miniature attributed to Gerard Horenbout

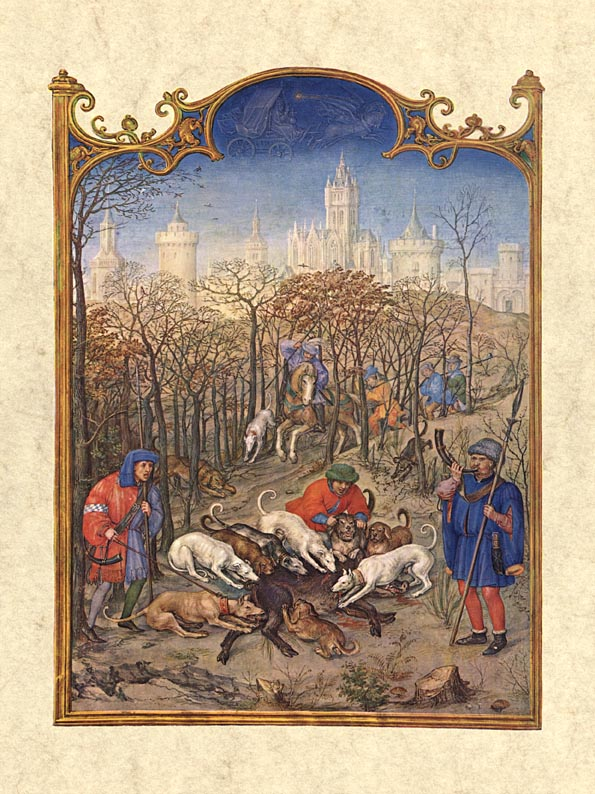
Miniature depicting the month December, from the Grimani Breviary, made by Horenbout with Alexander and Simon Bening

Gerard Horenbout or Gerard Hourenbout (c. 1465 – c. 1541) was a Flemish miniaturist, a late example of the miniature tradition in Early Netherlandish painting. He is "likely and widely accepted" to be the Master of James IV of Scotland, a leading miniaturist of the period, responsible for the Spinola Hours and other major projects of the last flowering of the Flemish miniature tradition.

== Biography ==
Horenbout lived and worked in Ghent and is best known as a manuscript illustrator. He also made stained glass, tapestries, embroidery designs, ironworks and panel painting. First mentioned in 1487, when he joined the painters Guild of Saint Luke. He was married to Margaret Svanders soon after joining the guild. They had six children, two of whom were the artists Lucas Horenbout and Susanna Hornebolt. There were also sons Eloy and Joris. Lucas, Susanna and at least one more of his sons were trained by Horenbout to be painters.

He had at least two apprentices, one in 1498, and one in 1502. In 1515, he was made painter to Archduchess Margaret of Austria, and also briefly worked at the court of Henry VIII in England. He was visited by Albrecht Dürer in 1521, when Dürer bought an illustrated manuscript made by his daughter Susanna Horenbout. His son Lucas Horenbout was also a well-known painter.

His wife, Margaret Svanders, or van Saunders, died in 1529 and he made the brass plaque found at All Saints' Church in Fulham, London. (Note: It is described as a memorial to "Margaret (Saunders), wife of Gerard Hornebolt, c. 1529, lozenge-shaped plate with head and shoulders of woman in shroud, and angels on each side above inscription, below a shield-of-arms, a cheveron between three martlets with an escutcheon on the cheveron charged with a mill-rind cross between four crescents for Hornebolt impaling a winnowing-fan with a molet of six points in chief for des Vanders quartering a cheveron between three moors' heads for Deman, between initials G.M. Flemish work.")

He died about 1540 or 1541.

== Works ==
- Miniatures in the Breviary of Eleanor of Portugal, ca. 1500
- Miniatures in the Hours of James IV of Scotland, between 1502 and 1503
- 16 miniatures in the Sforza Hours for Archduchess Margaret of Austria, between 1517 and 1520 (now in the British Library)
- Miniatures in the Grimani Breviary, before 1520
- Portraits of Lieven Van Pottelsberghe and Livina Van Steelant, c. 1525, in the Museum of Fine Arts, Ghent

Major works attributed to the Master of James IV of Scotland include the Spinola Hours in the Getty Museum, "the most pictorially ambitious and original sixteenth-century Flemish manuscript", the Grimani Breviary in Venice, the Holford Hours in Lisbon (1526, probably his last work), the "Rothschild Prayerbook" (or "Hours"), the "Vatican Hours" and two detached miniatures in the Cloisters Museum. On large projects he often collaborated with other masters. For example, in the Mayer van den Bergh Breviary, he was one of at least 12 artists who contributed to the decoration.

== Sources ==
- T Kren & S McKendrick (eds), Illuminating the Renaissance: The Triumph of Flemish Manuscript Painting in Europe, Getty Museum/Royal Academy of Arts, 2003, ISBN 1-903973-28-7
