= Hours of James IV of Scotland =

1503 Flemish book of hours

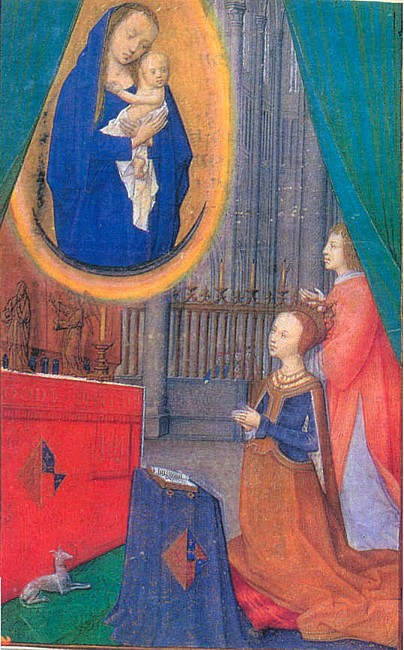
The miniature of Margaret at prayer (frame not shown), f. 243v

The Hours of James IV of Scotland, Prayer book of James IV and Queen Margaret (or variants) is an illuminated book of hours, produced in 1503 or later, probably in Ghent. It marks a highpoint of the late 15th century Ghent-Bruges school of illumination and is now in the Austrian National Library in Vienna (Österreichische Nationalbibliothek, Codex Vindobonensis 1897). It is thought to have been a wedding gift from James IV of Scotland or another Scottish nobleman to James's wife Margaret Tudor on the occasion of their marriage, perhaps finishing a book already started for another purpose. A number of artists worked on the extensive programme of decoration, so that "the manuscript in its entirety presents a rather odd picture of heterogeneity". The best known miniature, a full-page portrait of James at prayer before an altar with an altarpiece of Christ and an altar frontal with James's coat-of-arms, gave his name to the Master of James IV of Scotland, who is now generally identified as Gerard Horenbout, court painter to Margaret of Austria; he did only one other miniature in the book. The equivalent image of Margaret is the only image by another artist, using a rather generic face for the queen's portrait, and in a similar style to that of the Master of the First Prayer Book of Maximilian. Other artists worked on the other miniatures, which include an unusual series of unpopulated landscapes in the calendar – perhaps the Flemish artists were not sure how Scots should be dressed.

Drawings had evidently been sent to Flanders of James' portrait and the heraldry of the couple, but perhaps not of Margaret. Probably drawings were sent of the panel portraits in Edinburgh of James III of Scotland and his queen Margaret of Denmark by Hugo van der Goes, since the portrait miniatures show similar iconography. After she was widowed, Margaret gave the book to her sister Mary Tudor, Queen of France, inscribing it (on f. 188): "Madame I pray your grace / Remember on me when ye / loke upon this bok / Your lofing syster / Margaret". By the time of Leopold I, Holy Roman Emperor in the late 17th century it had entered the library of the Austrian Habsburgs in Vienna. It was exhibited in London and Malibu in 2003–2004.

== Contents ==
The manuscript consists of ii + 248 + ii folios of 20 x 14 cm. The text is a single column of 20 lines per page, in bastarda script, by a known scribe (The "Thin Descender Scribe"). The illumination is of uneven quality, by many hands, consisting of a total of 19 full-page and 46 small miniatures, as well as 14 half-page miniatures of landscapes (but with no attempt to show the changing seasons) in the calendar. There are two historiated initials, nine historiated borders, and decorated borders on every text page. The heraldry of the couple appears in several places, including a full page devoted to James's arms.
