= Master of James IV of Scotland =

Flemish manuscript illuminator and painter (fl. 1485 – c. 1526)

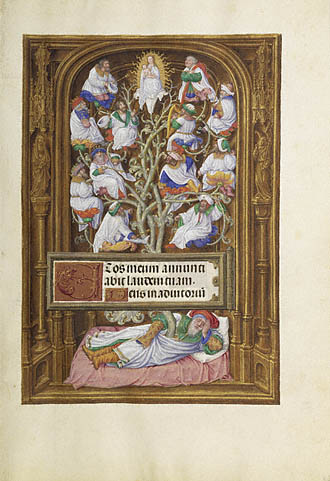
Tree of Jesse by the Master

The Master of James IV of Scotland (fl. 1485 – c. 1526) was a Flemish manuscript illuminator and painter most likely based in Ghent, or perhaps Bruges. Circumstantial evidence, including several larger panel paintings, indicates that he may be identical with Gerard Horenbout. He was the leading illuminator of the penultimate generation of Flemish illuminators, and the Ghent-Bruges school. The painter's name is derived from a portrait of James IV of Scotland which, together with one of his Queen Margaret Tudor, is in the Prayer book of James IV and Queen Margaret, a book of hours commissioned by James and now in Vienna. He has been called one of the finest illuminators active in Flanders around 1500, and contributed to many lavish and important books besides directing an active studio of his own.

Stylistically, the Master's miniatures are distinguished by their collections of robust and unidealized figures, set against colorful landscapes and detailed interiors. He had a knack for depicting narrative, and would frequently use obscure Biblical images when constructing his paintings; his scenes of daily life, designed for calendar illuminations, are considered particularly vivid. Most importantly, the Master was interested in experimenting with the layout of his drawings on the page. Using various illusionistic elements, he often blurred the line between the miniature and its border, frequently using both in his efforts to advance the narrative of his scenes.

The Master's work is sometimes associated with the work of the Master of the Lübeck Bible. Major works include the largest contribution to the Spinola Hours in the Getty Museum, "the most pictorially ambitious and original sixteenth-century Flemish manuscript", the Grimani Breviary in Venice, the Holford Hours in Lisbon (1526, probably his last work), the "Rothschild Prayerbook" (or "Hours"), the "Vatican Hours" and two detached miniatures in the Cloisters Museum. On large projects he often collaborated with other masters. For example, in the Mayer van den Bergh Breviary, he was one of at least 12 artists who contributed to the decoration.

== Gerard Horenbout ==
Gerard Horenbout was court painter, from 1515 to about 1522, to Margaret of Austria, Regent of the Netherlands. He then went, with his son Lucas Horenbout and daughter Suzanna, to England, where he was recorded in 1528 (Lucas had been there since 1525 at least), and later returned to the Continent, probably after 1531; he had died in Ghent by 1540. It has been suggested that their move was in connection with an attempt by the King, or possibly Cardinal Wolsey, to revive English manuscript illumination by establishing a workshop in London, but this is controversial. Susanna, who was also an illuminator, is recorded in 1529 as married to a John Palmer and in England.
