= Sforza Hours =

Book of hours by Giovanni Pierto Birago and Gerard Horenbout

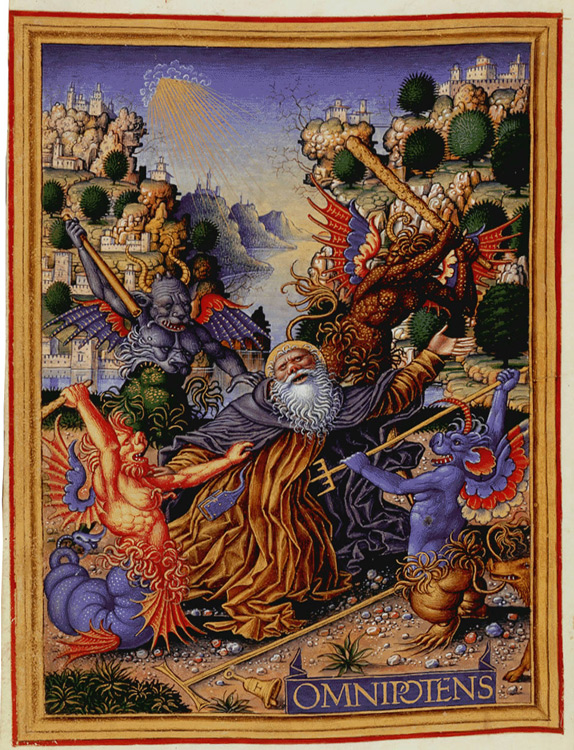
St Anthony by Birago

The Sforza Hours (British Library, London, Add. MS 34294), is a richly illuminated book of hours initiated by Bona Sforza, widow of Galeazzo Sforza, Duke of Milan, around 1490, who commissioned the illuminator Giovanni Pietro Birago. The book remained in an unfinished state for 30 years until Margaret of Austria, Regent of the Netherlands, commissioned its completion in 1517–20 from the artist Gerard Horenbout. The book therefore contains decoration of the highest quality by two artists. It provides a unique example of an early sixteenth-century Northern Renaissance illuminator's response to Milanese art of the late Quattrocento. The history of the Sforza Hours also includes one of the earliest recorded examples of art theft.

It has been in the British Library since 1893.

== History ==
=== 1490–1504 ===
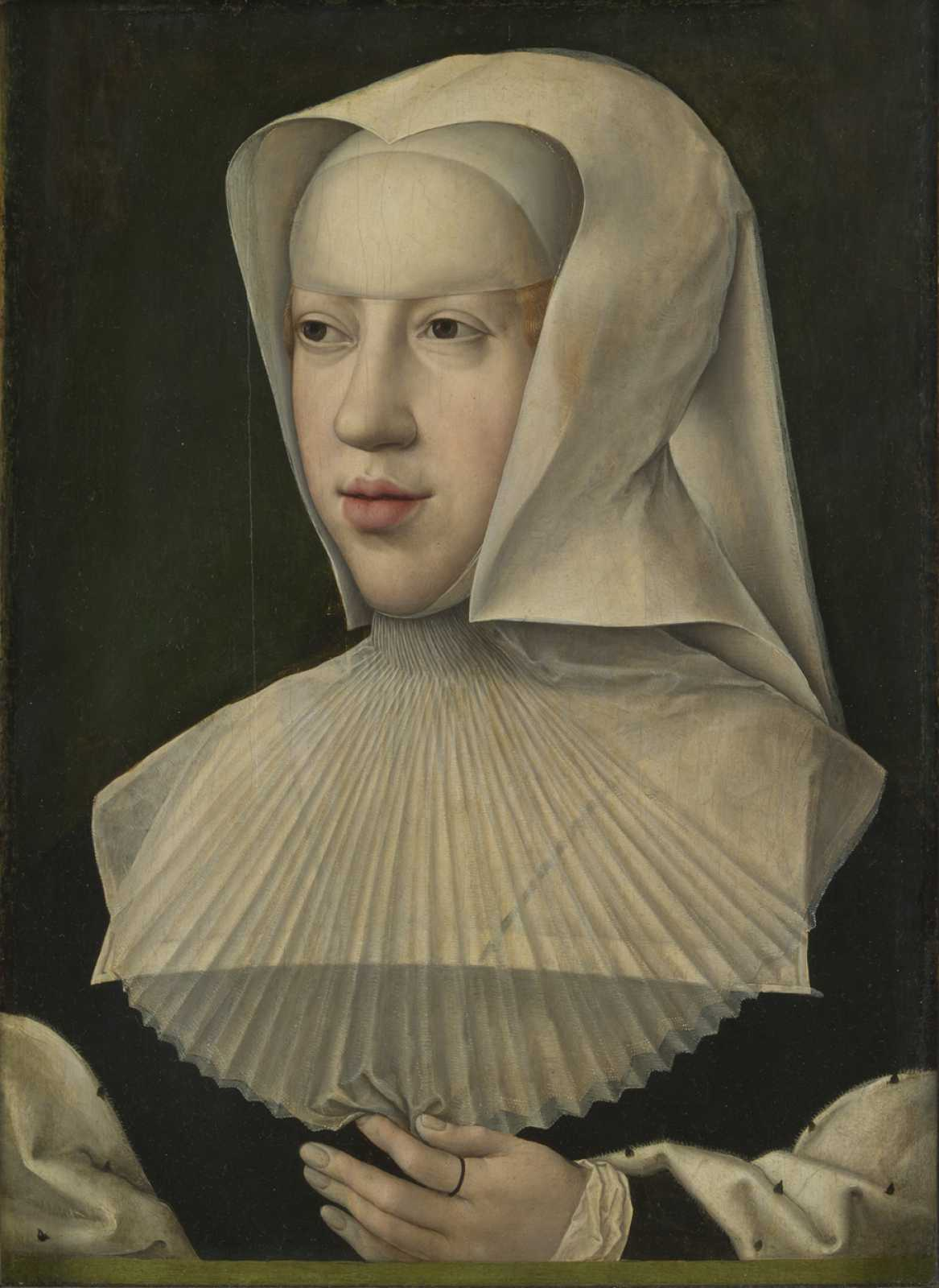
Portrait of Margaret of Austria by Bernard van Orley

Bona commissioned the Book of Hours around 1490, fourteen years after the assassination of her husband Galeazzo Sforza. Completion of the book was probably abandoned in 1494 when Bona found herself excluded from power by her brother-in-law, Ludovico Sforza, following the death of her son Gian Galeazzo. She returned to her native Savoy in 1495 as a guest of her nephew Philibert of Savoy. Bona died in 1503 and Philibert also died the following year, whereupon the book became the property of his widow, Margaret of Austria.

==== Theft ====
Bona of Savoy and Margaret of Austria were identified as the original owners of the book in 1894 from mottos and inscriptions on various folios. Also uncovered at this time was a letter from Birago that had been published in 1885. The letter, from about 1490, was addressed to an unnamed correspondent, 'your Excellency', who was in possession of a stolen portion of the manuscript. Birago's letter therefore makes the Sforza Hours one of the earliest recorded examples of art theft. In the letter, Birago claims that a friar, Fra Johanne Jacopo, had stolen the incomplete Book of Hours. Birago requests that Jacopo remains in prison until the thief has paid for the stolen items. According to Birago, the material stolen by Jacopo was worth more than 500 ducats. This was an enormous sum at the time and an indication of the contemporary value of the Sforza Hours.

It is not known whether Birago received compensation for the theft of part of the book or what happened to most of the stolen pages. It can be ascertained from the current condition of the book that the pages stolen from Birago included the entire calendar, folios from the Gospel lessons, the Hours of the Cross, the Hours of the Holy Spirit, the Hours of the Virgin, the Passion according to Saint Luke, three prayers to the Virgin, and the Suffrages of the Saints.

=== 1506–1520 ===
Margaret, who was the daughter of the Habsburg Maximilian I, Holy Roman Emperor, moved to the Netherlands in 1506 as Regent for her nephew Charles and there she became one of the great patrons of the Northern Renaissance (the Arnolfini Portrait was a notable item in her collection). In 1517 she instigated the completion of the Sforza Hours. A French scribe, Etienne de Lale, was first engaged to replace missing text pages. These pages were executed in a rounded Italian Gothic hand in an attempt to imitate the book's original script. Gerard Horenbout was then commissioned to paint sixteen miniatures and two borders.

There is a portrait of Charles, wearing the chain of the Order of the Golden Fleece, in one of Horenbout's text illustrations dated 1520. It is therefore widely believed that Margaret gave the Sforza Hours to her nephew as a gift on the occasion of his coronation as Charles V, Holy Roman Emperor.

=== 1871–2004 ===
The book did not resurface until 1871, when it was acquired by John Charles Robinson from a priest in Madrid for eight hundred pounds. It was then sold to John Malcolm of Poltalloch, who presented it to the British Museum (the library of which is now the British Library) in 1893, shortly before his death.

A miniature from the body of the work stolen from Birago, Adoration of the Magi (British Library, Add 45722), was given to the British Museum anonymously in 1941.

In 1956, Birago was confirmed as an original artist of Sforza Hours following the discovery of his signature on the frontispiece of Giovanni Simonetta's Sforziada from 1490.

In 1960, an article was published that identified two calendar miniatures from the Sforza Hours in the possession of a book dealer. These are likely to have been May and October which were later sold to the British Library by a private collector based in New York: May was acquired in 1984, and the Library paid £191,000 for October in 2004.

== Structure and contents ==
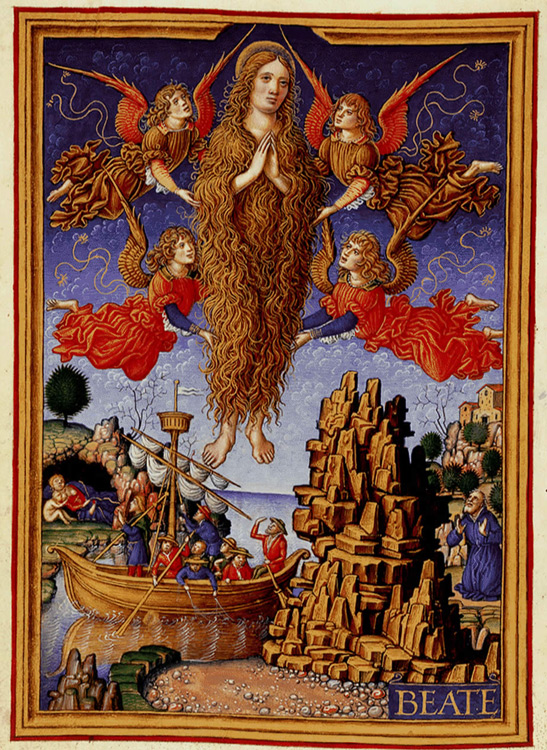
St Mary Magdalene by Birago

The book comprises 348 leaves of vellum. Nearly a third of these are replacements. The book was designed to be easily carried: hence its pages are small, measuring 13.1 x 9.3 cm. It contains 64 full-page miniatures and 140 text pages with decorated borders and small miniatures. Its binding, in dark red Morocco, dates from around 1896.

Birago's miniatures are in the North Italian antiquarian style of Andrea Mantegna. Horenbout's additions to the Sforza Hours demonstrate a deliberate attempt to adapt his own style to a more Italianate one that would complement Birago's existing illuminations. Horenbout's Saint Mark (fol.10.v), for example, has similar features to Birago's St Matthew (fol.7.r), such as the Italian Renaissance architectural setting and the scroll in the foreground. The framing of the miniatures with gold frames with simple mouldings, imitating the wooden frames of contemporary panel paintings, can also be seen in the French Grandes Heures of Anne of Brittany of 1503–1508.

=== Calendar ===
Only May (British Library, Add. MS 62997) and October (British Library, Add. MS 80800) by Birago are known to exist from the calendar. The calendar probably belonged to the stolen part of the manuscript about which Birago complained in his letter.

=== Gospel lessons ===
The Gospel lessons contain the following miniatures: St John (fol.1.r), St Luke (fol.4.r), and St Matthew by Birago and St Mark by Horenbout (fol.10.v). Half the contents of the Gospel lessons are replacements.

The varying quality of Birago's miniatures in this section is evidence of extensive studio collaboration.

=== Hours of the Cross ===
This includes a full-page miniature by Horenbout of Christ nailed to the Cross (fol.12.v). This miniature has been likened to Gerard David's panel of the same subject (in the National Gallery, London), but it is possible that Horenbout may have seen the subject in the Hours of Mary of Burgundy which displays similar details to Horenbout's painting.

The section also contains 18 decorated borders by Birago.

=== Hours of the Holy Spirit ===
This section has survived completely intact. It contains the Descent of the Holy Spirit (fol.28.r) and twenty-one decorated borders by Birago.

=== Hours of the Virgin ===
This part includes 8 full-page miniatures by Horenbout, including the Visitation (fol.61.r) and the Adoration of the Magi (fol.97.r) (Birago's miniature of the Adoration of the Magi also exists (British Library, Add 45722)), and 44 decorated borders by Birago.

The Visitation includes a portrait of Margaret of Austria as the Virgin's cousin Elizabeth. It is possible that Margaret possessed a desire to identify herself and her situation with the aged and childless Elizabeth.

=== The accessory prayer Salve Regina ===
Includes a full-page miniature by Horenbout of the Virgin and Child in Glory (fol.133.v).

=== Passion according to St Luke ===
This section contains the Entry into Jerusalem (fol.136.v) by Horenbout and 8 miniatures that represent a complete Passion cycle by Birago. These include the impressively composed Last Supper (fol.138.v).

=== Seven prayers of St Gregory ===
These prayers contain a full-page miniature of the Mass of St Gregory (fol.167.r) and 5 decorated borders by Birago depicting Passion scenes.

=== 'Obsecro Te' and 'O Intemerata' ===
A substantial portion of this section consists of replacements. Birago's Assumption of the Virgin (fol.170.r), however, has survived. There is also a full-page miniature by Horenbout of the Virgin and Child (fol.177.v).

=== Suffrages of the Saints ===
This is considered the finest cycle of decoration in the Sforza Hours. It contains 25 vibrant and dynamic miniatures by Birago of individual saints, arranged in order of importance, beginning with St Michael (fol.186.v) and ending with St Mary Magdalene (fol.211.v) (this has been misplaced in the series – it should end with St Clare (fol.210.v).

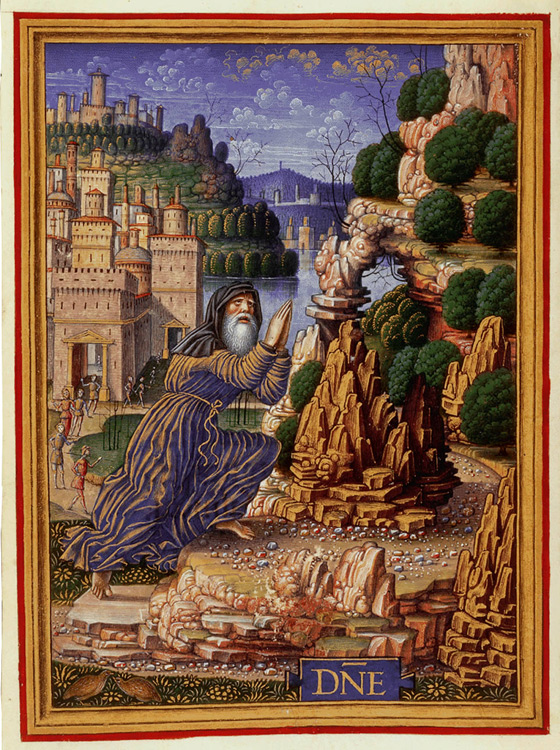
King David in Penitence by Birago (fol. 212v)

The series contains one Horenbout miniature: St Andrew (fol.189.v).

=== Seven Penitential Psalms ===
In this section there is a full-page miniature by Horenbout of King David in Penitence and six miniatures of the same subject by Birago.

There is also one decorated border by Birago (fol.213.r) to which Horenbout added the portrait of Charles V.

=== Litany ===
More than half the folios of the Litany are replacements. It includes one miniature, the Procession of St Gregory (fol.236.r), and 8 decorated borders by Birago depicting Old Testament heroines and female saints.

=== Office of the Dead ===
This part contains one miniature by Horenbout, the Raising of Lazarus (fol.257.v). There is one miniature, the Death of the Virgin and 41 decorated borders by Birago. Nearly a third of this section is replacements.

The Office of the Dead is followed by the Prayer of the name of Jesus from the epistles of St Paul (fols 343.r-348.v) which is an unillustrated addition of around 1600.

== Gallery ==
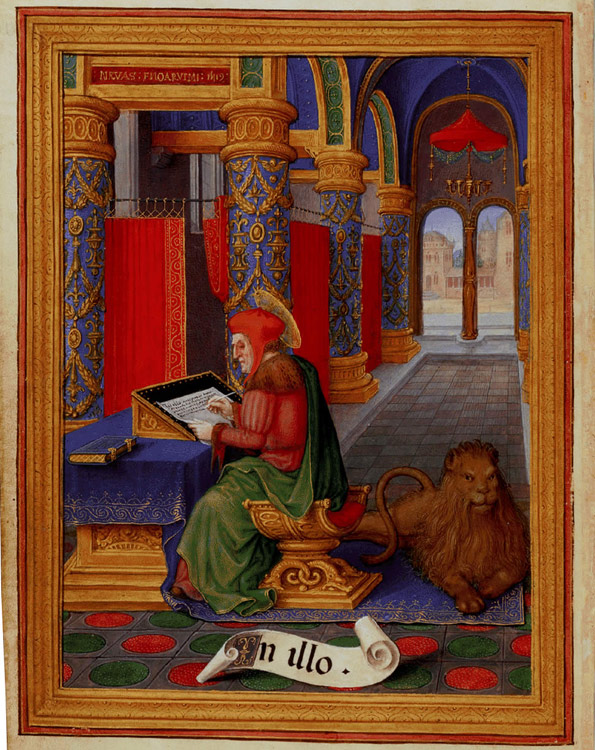
St Mark by Gerard (or Lucas) Horenbout

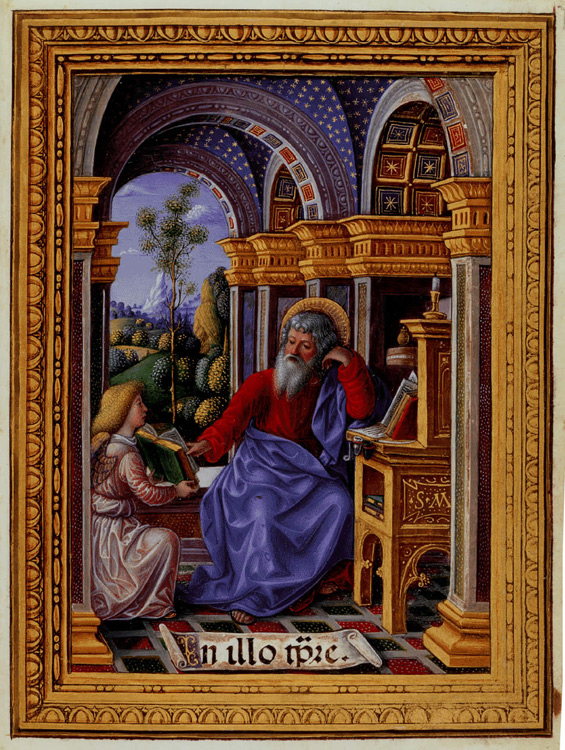
St Matthew by Birago

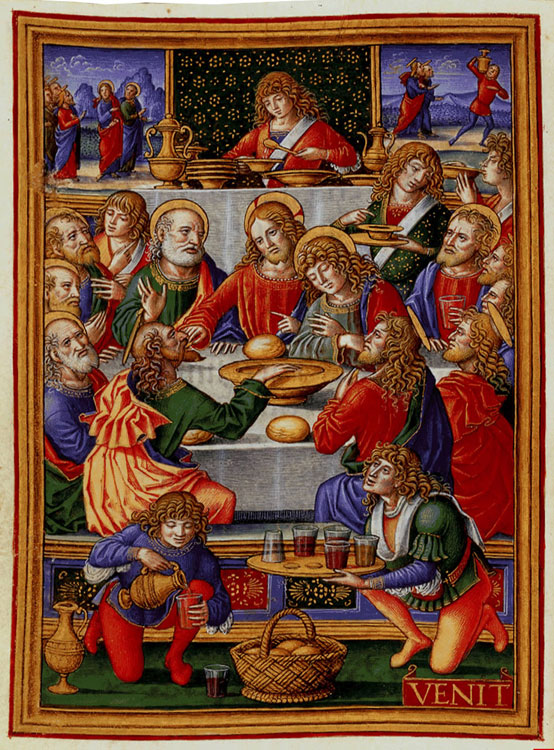
Last Supper by Birago

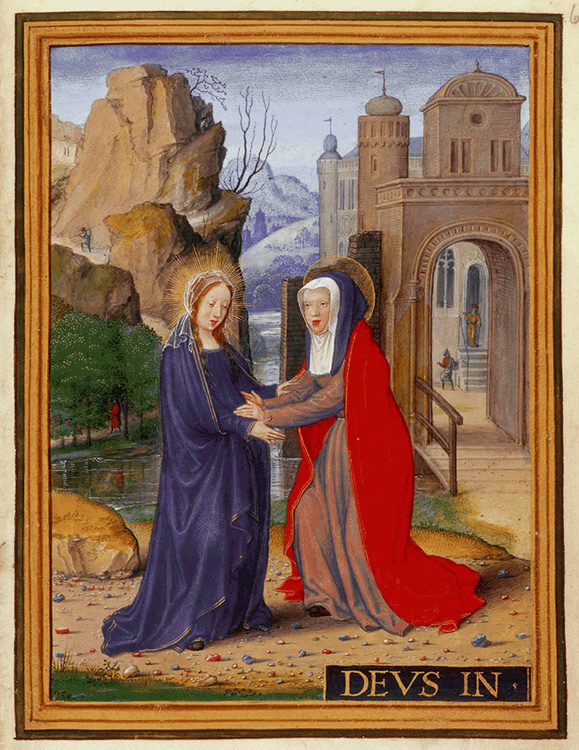
The Visitation by Horenbout. Margaret of Austria, is portrayed as Elizabeth.

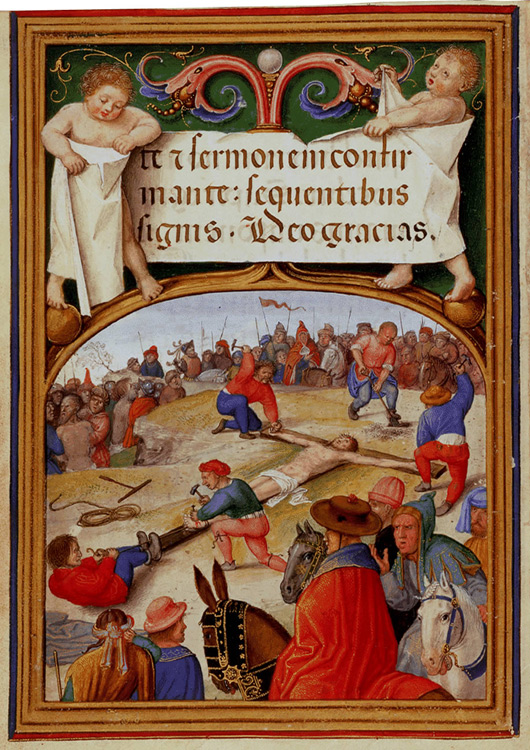
Christ nailed to the Cross by Horenbout. This work is reminiscent of a painting of the same subject by Gerard David in the National Gallery, London.
