= Master of the Lübeck Bible =

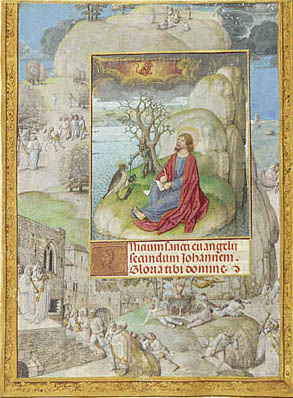
St. John on Patmos (c. 1510 - 1520). Tempera colors, gold, and ink on parchment. 9 1/8 x 6 9/16 in. In the collection of the Getty Museum, Los Angeles

Master of the Lübeck Bible (fl. c. 1485 – c. 1520) was a Flemish manuscript illuminator and printmaker. He is named for a series of woodcuts designed for a Bible printed at Lübeck, Germany in 1494. He has long been known as a contributor to several early printed books; only recently, however, has their style been associated to certain illuminated manuscripts. Relatively few illuminations have been ascribed to the Master. Those that have been share an almost frenetic sense of movement, combined with a distorted quality, that distinguishes his printed output. His figures have oddly elongated faces, while the spaces they inhabit have conversely been strangely foreshortened. The Master's city of origin is unknown; his close association with the Master of James IV of Scotland, who is thought to have been active in Ghent, may indicate that his base of operations was that city.
