= Master of the Dresden Prayerbook =

Flemish manuscript illuminator

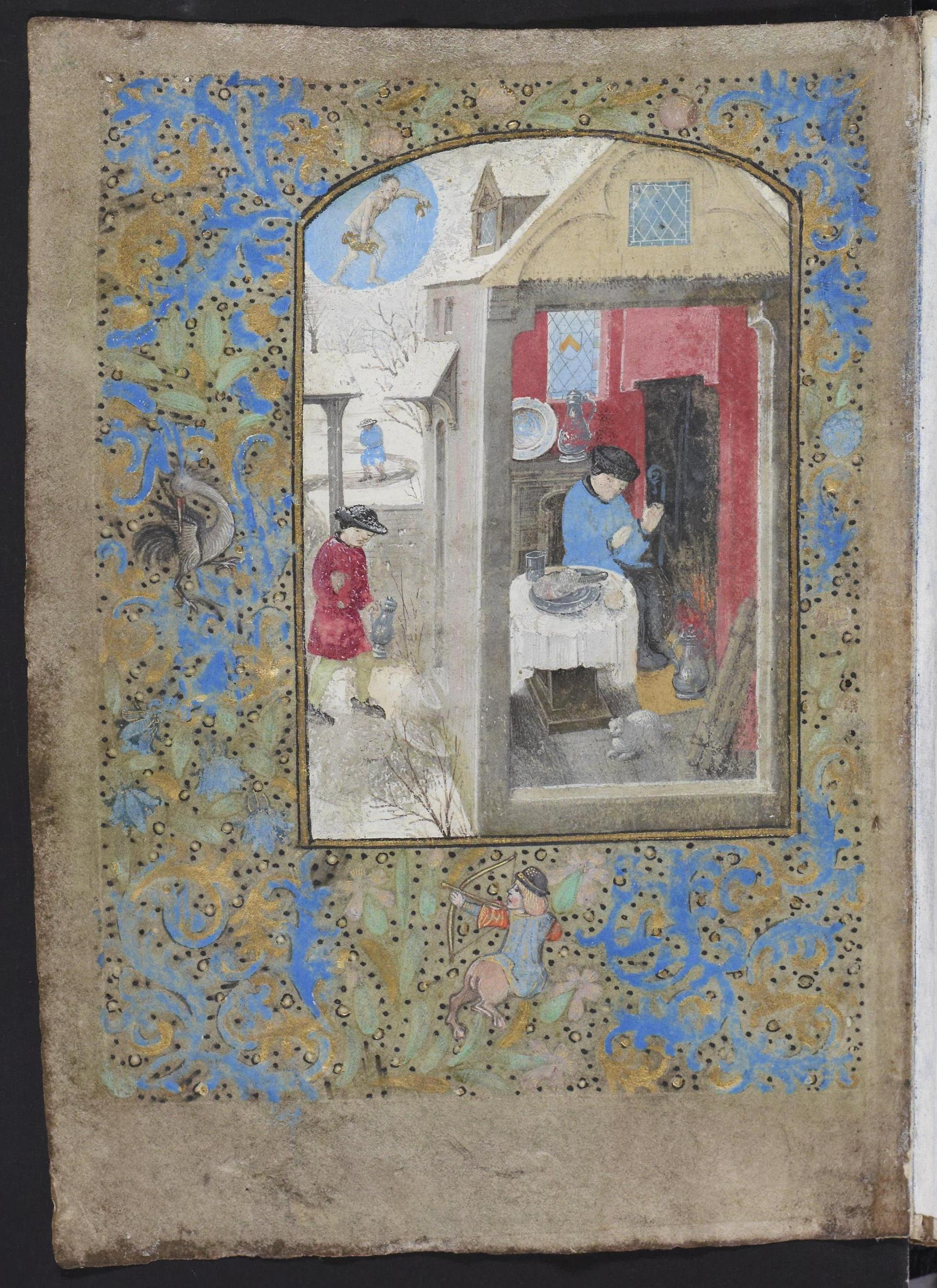
January from the Dresden Prayerbook

The Master of the Dresden Prayerbook was an anonymous master illuminator active in Flanders between 1460 and 1520. He is named after the manuscript now in the State Library of Saxony. Over fifty manuscripts are attributed to him.

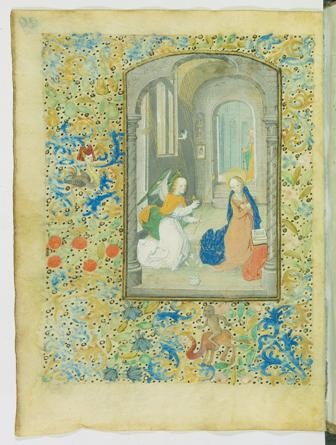
Verkündigung an Maria (Meister des Dresdener Gebetbuches), 1470

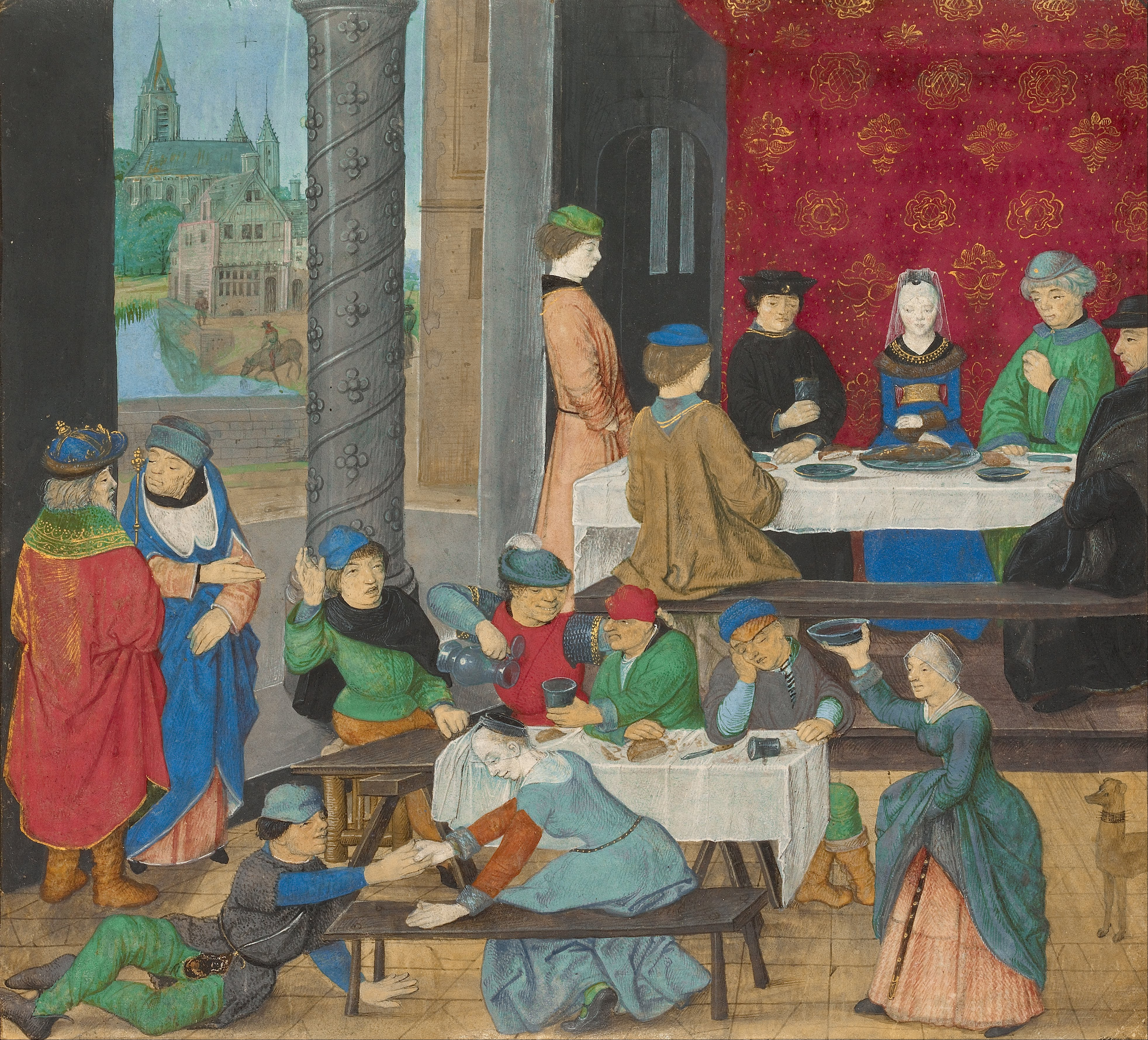
The Temperate and Intemperate portraying temperate (nobles) and intemperate (peasants) and Valerius Maximus instructing Emperor Tiberius on the difference

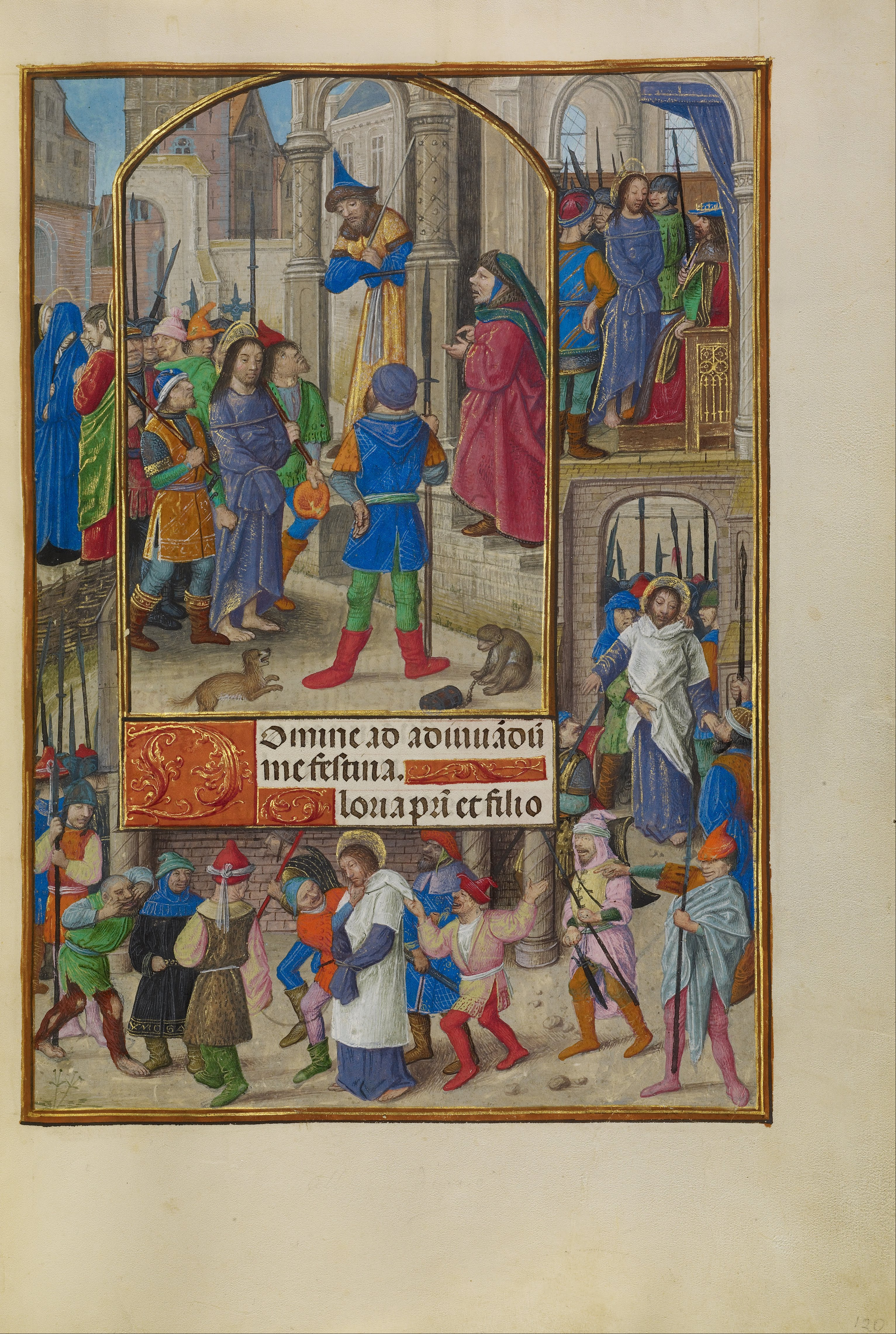
Christ before Caiaphas, Master of the Dresden Prayer Book

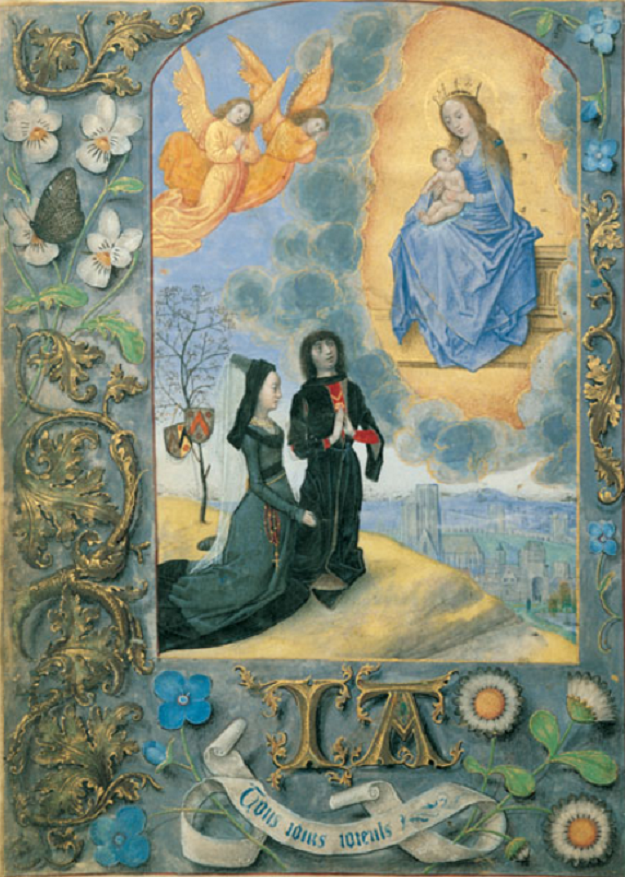
The receiver-general of Flanders Jan van der Scaghe and his wife Anne de Memere praying before the Blessed Virgin Mary with Child by Master of the Dresden Prayer Book or Ghent Associate of the Vienna Master of Mary of Burgundy
