= Master of the Prayer Books of around 1500 =

Flemish manuscript artist

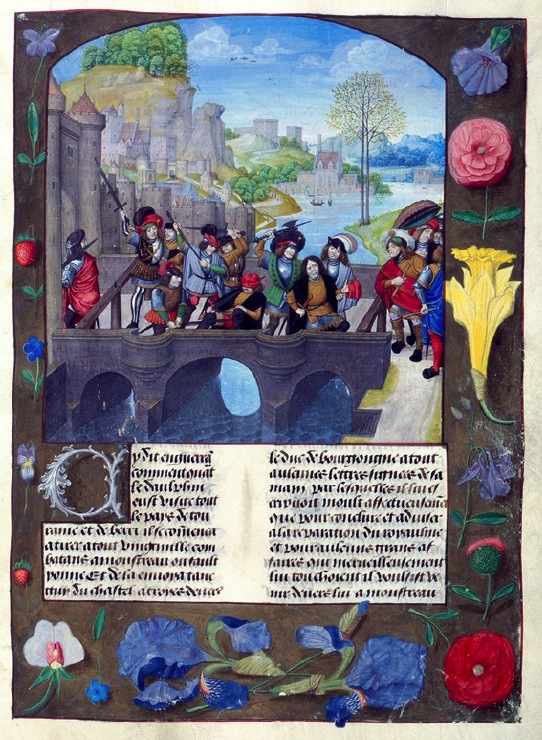
Illustration showing the assassination of John the Fearless from Monstrelet's Chronique

The Master of the Prayer Books of around 1500 was a Flemish painter of illuminated manuscripts and miniatures active in Bruges from about 1485 until around 1520. His name is derived from a collection of devotional manuscripts from the same artist dating to about the start of the 16th century. The name notwithstanding, the Master is best known for the work he did painting secular images, incorporating details from daily life in a number of his original narratives. His interest in courtly life, as well as the daily activities of the lower classes, may be seen as well in his paintings for calendars. He may have been a small group of artists in a workshop rather than an individual. His exceptional Roman de la Rose British Library Harley MS 4425 has 92 large and high quality miniatures, with a date around 1500.
