= Rinceau =

Type of ornamental or floral motif

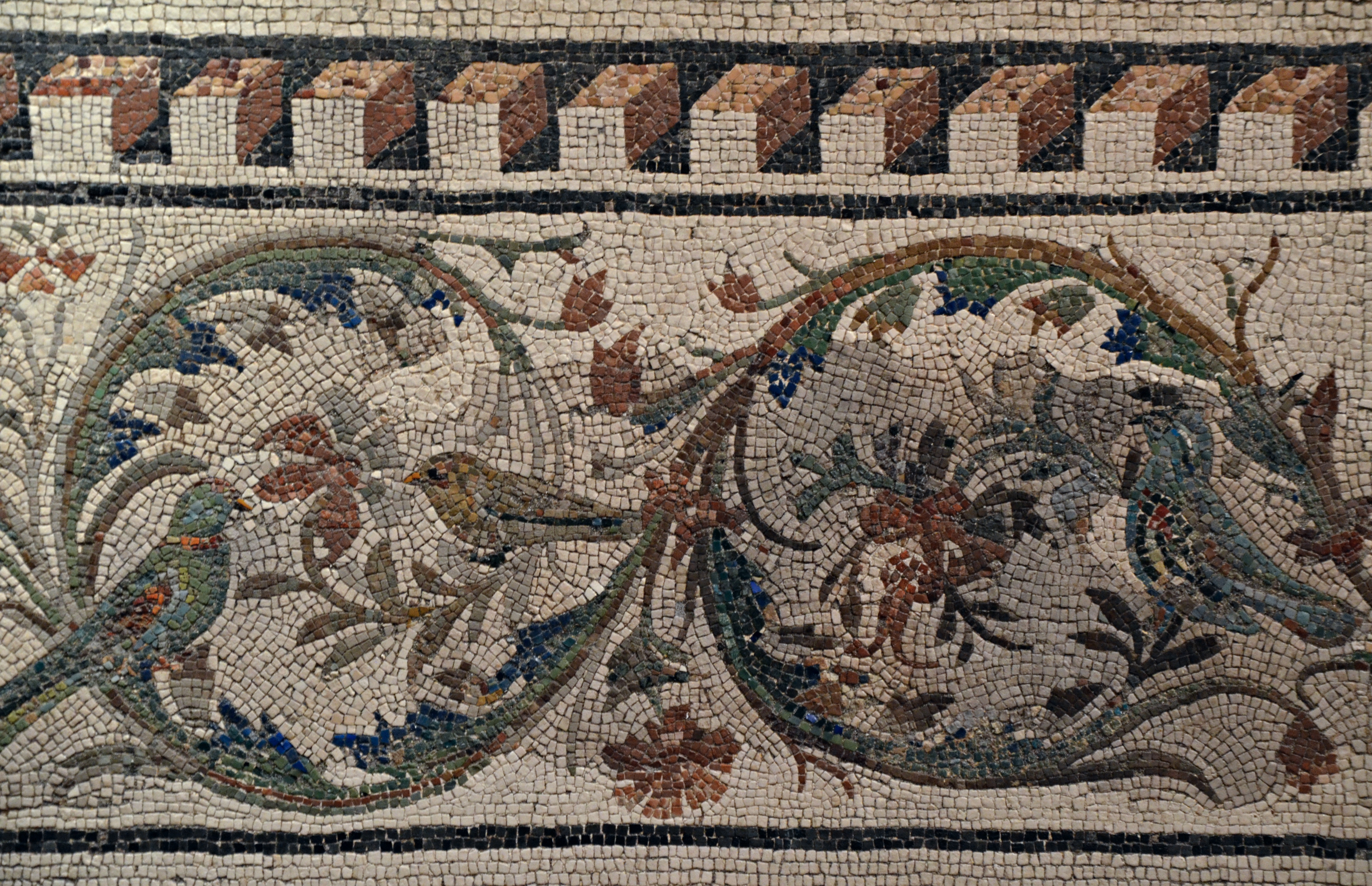
Mosaic border of rinceaux and animals, from the Via Panisperna in Rome, late 2nd - early 1st century BC

In architecture and the decorative arts, a rinceau (plural rinceaux; from the French, derived from old French rain 'branch with foliage') is a decorative form consisting of a continuous wavy stemlike motif from which smaller leafy stems or groups of leaves branch out at more or less regular intervals. The English term scroll is more often used in English, especially when the pattern is regular, repeating along a narrow zone. In English "rinceau" tends to be used where the design spreads across a wider zone, in a similar style to an Islamic arabesque pattern.

The use of rinceaux is frequent in the friezes of Roman buildings, where it is generally found in a frieze, the middle element of an entablature, just below the cornice. It is also decorated in the jamb ornaments and capitals of Romanesque structures and in friezes and panels of buildings in the various Renaissance styles, where tiny animals or human heads also appear.

The rinceau experienced a return to the simpler Classic style in the 17th century, and in the subsequent century it was applied more freely, without a strict repetition of identical forms.

== Gallery ==
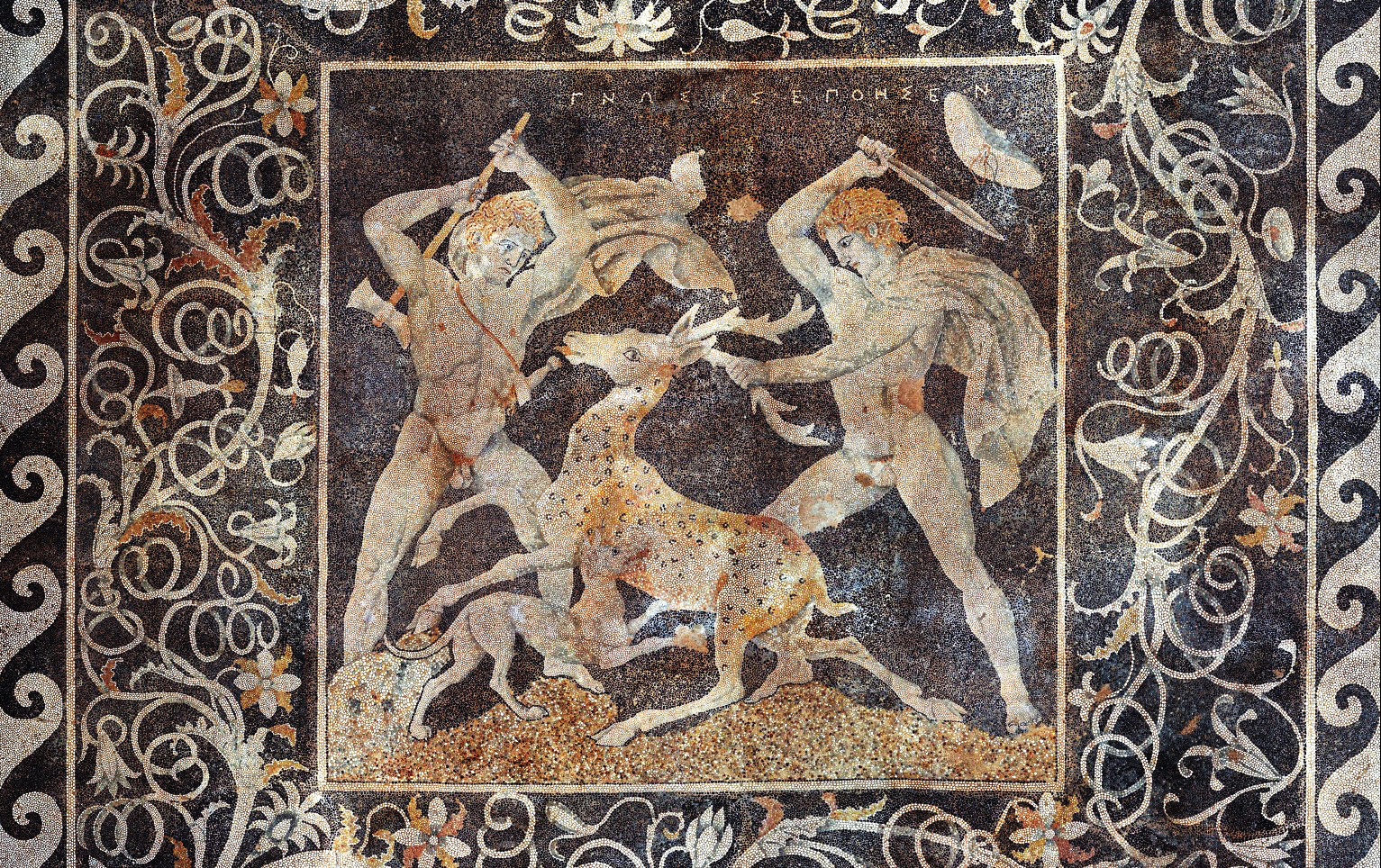
Ancient Greek rinceau on a mosaic of a stag hunt, Pella, Greece, unknown architect or craftsman, 4th century BC

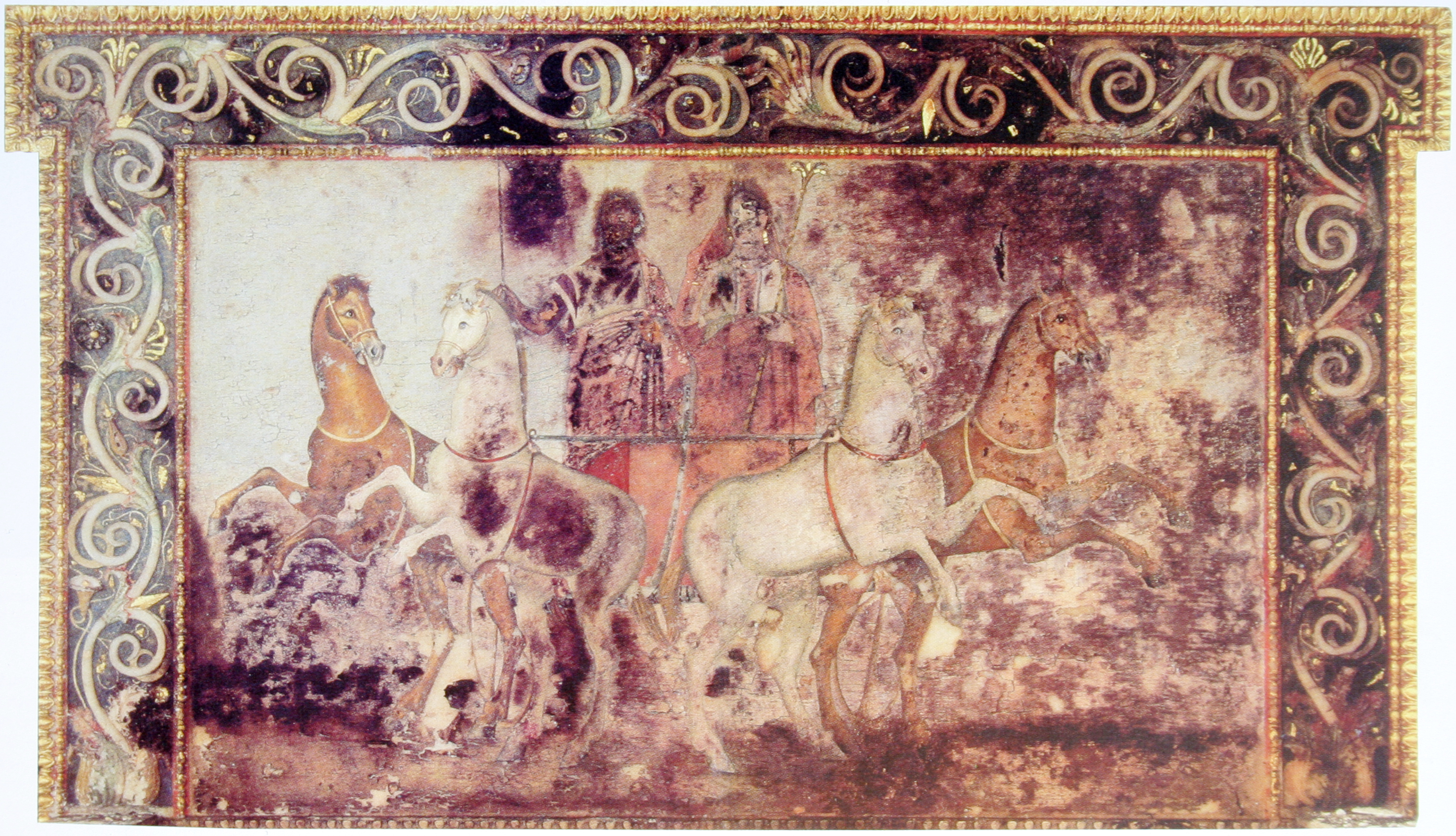
Hades and Persephone, c.340 BC, pigments on marble, Museum of the Royal Tombs of Aigai, Vergina, Greece

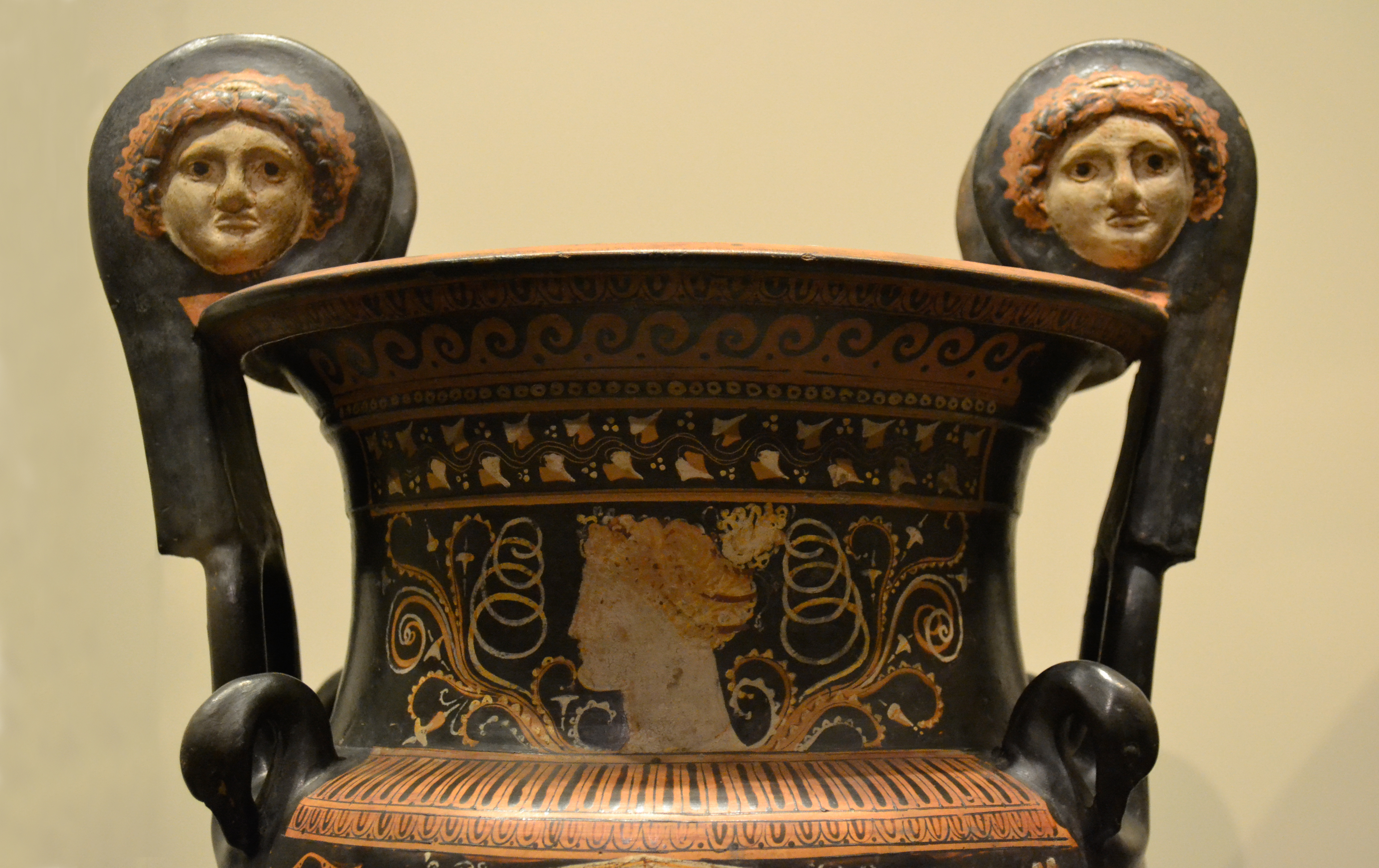
Ancient Greek rinceaux on a krater, by the painter of Copenhagen 4223, 340-320 BC, ceramic, National Archaeological Museum, Madrid, Spain

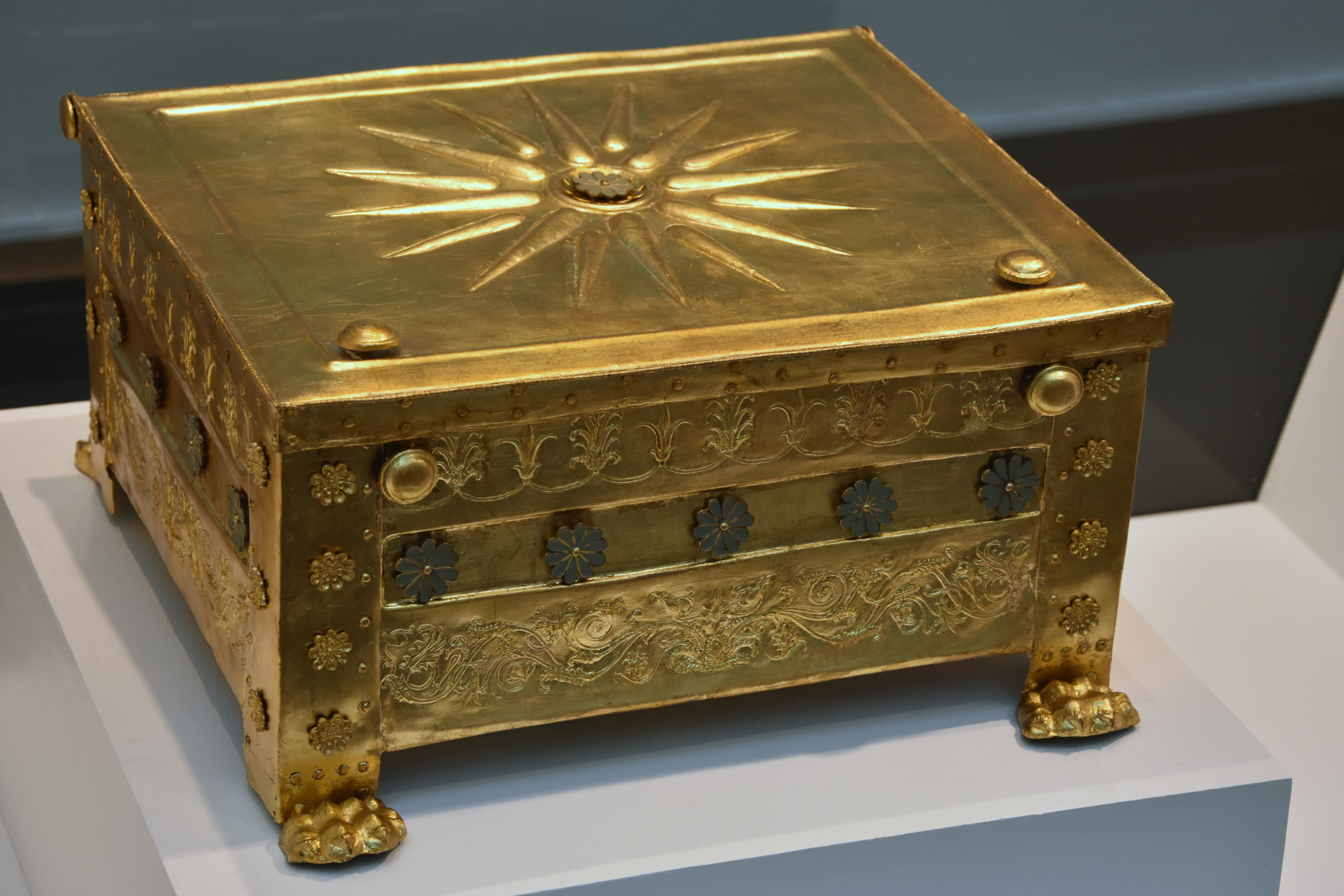
Ancient Greek rinceaux on a larnax of Philip II, 330-320 BC, gold and enamel, Museum of the Royal Tombs of Aigai, Vergina, Greece

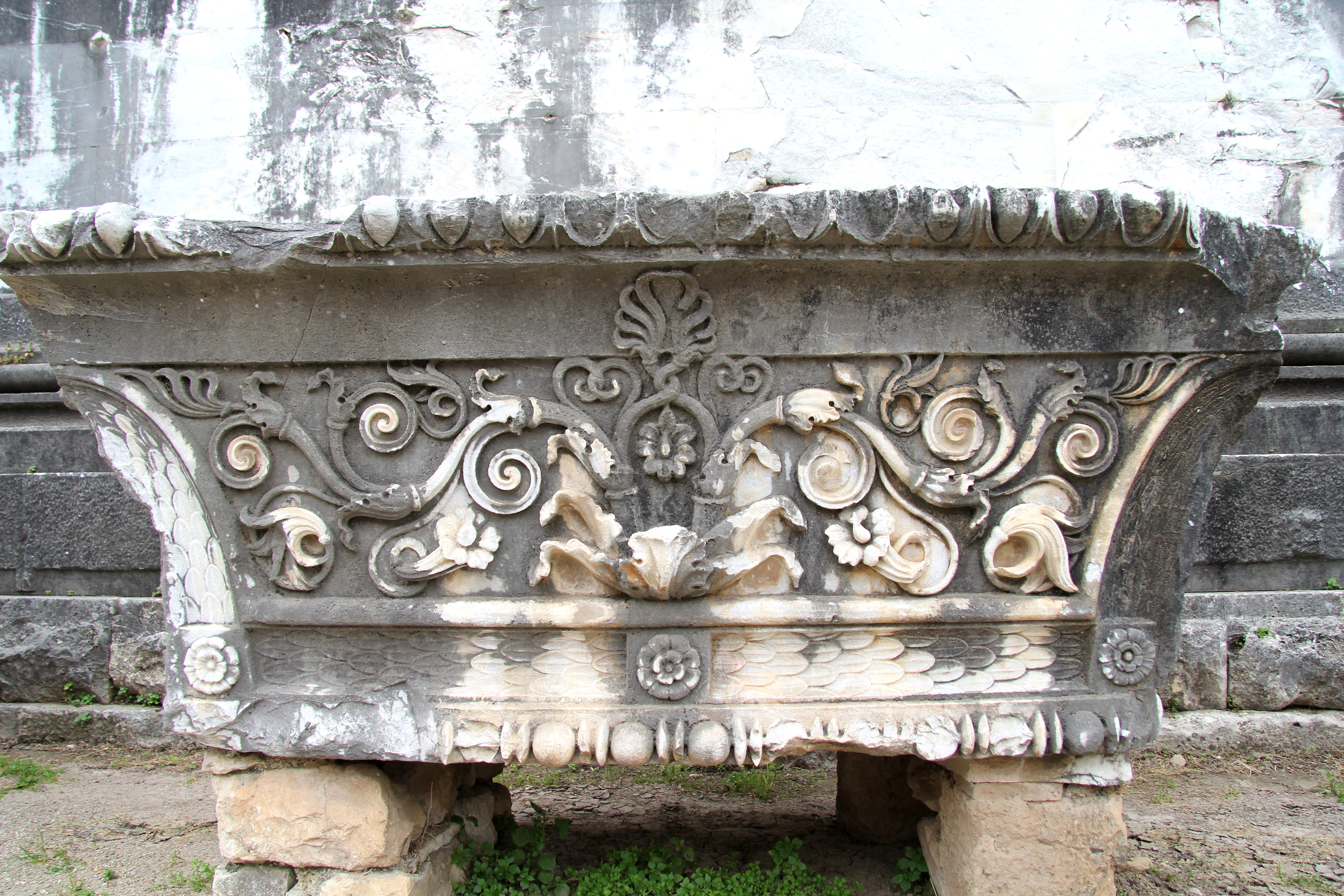
Ancient Greek rinceaux on a capital from the ruins of the Temple of Apollo at Didyma, Turkey, unknown architect or sculptor, c.300-150 BC

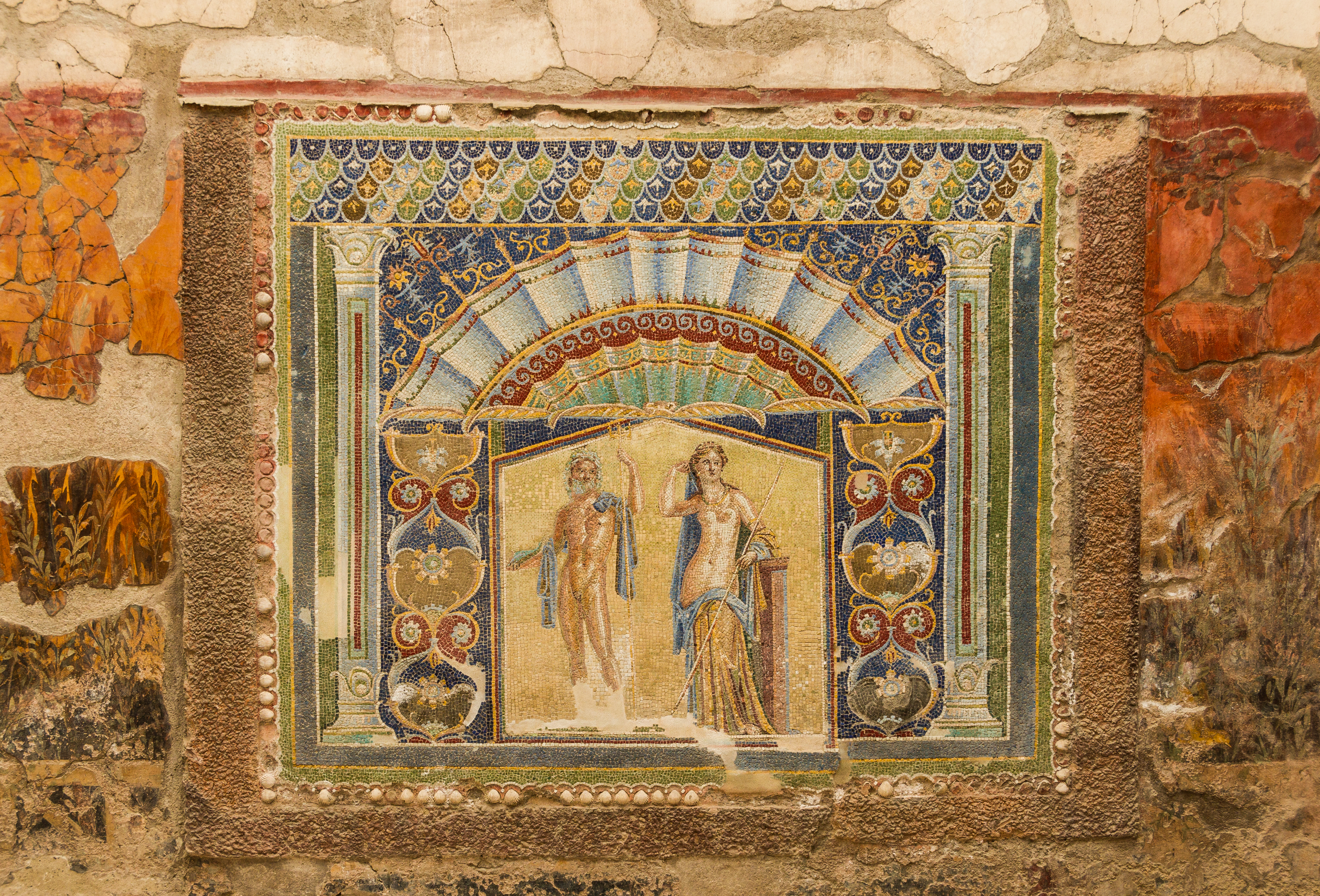
Polychrome Roman mosaic of Neptune and Amphitrite, c.70 BC, mosaic, Casa di Nettuno e Anfitrite, Herculaneum Archaeological Park, Ercolano, Italy

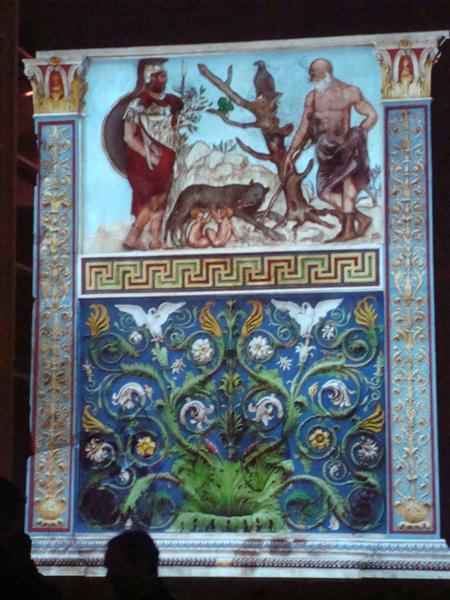
Polychrome Roman rinceau in an arabesque on the Ara Pacis, Rome, unknown architect and sculptors, 13-9 BC

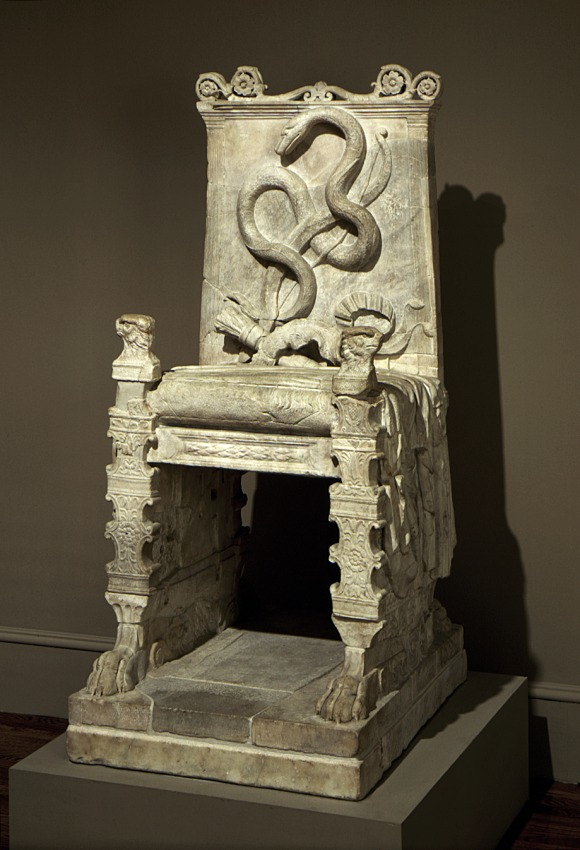
Roman rinceaux at the top of a throne of Apollo, late 1st century BC, marble, Los Angeles County Museum of Art, US

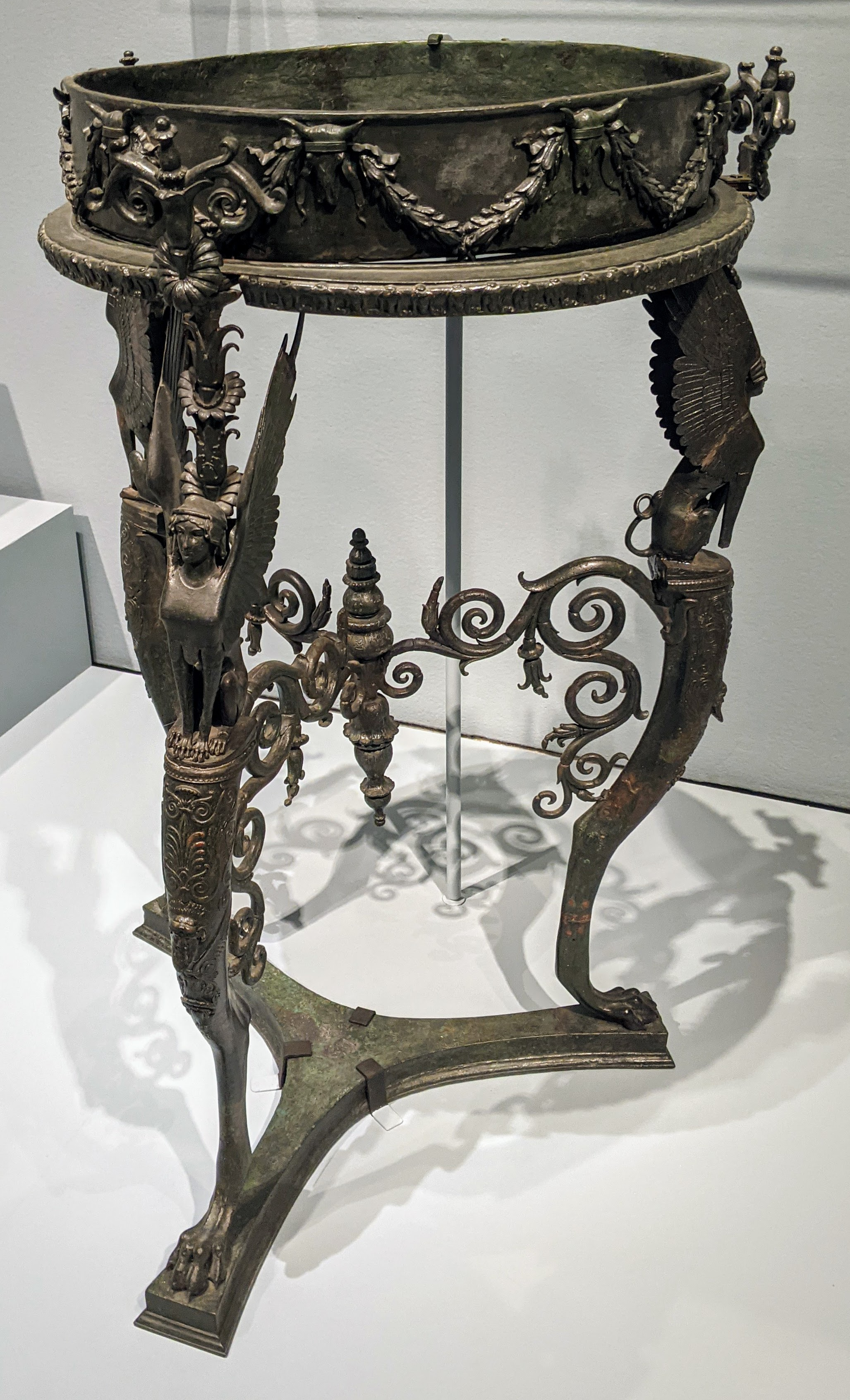
Roman rinceaux on a tripod with sphinxes, late 1st century BC-1st century AD, bronze, National Archaeological Museum, Naples, Italy

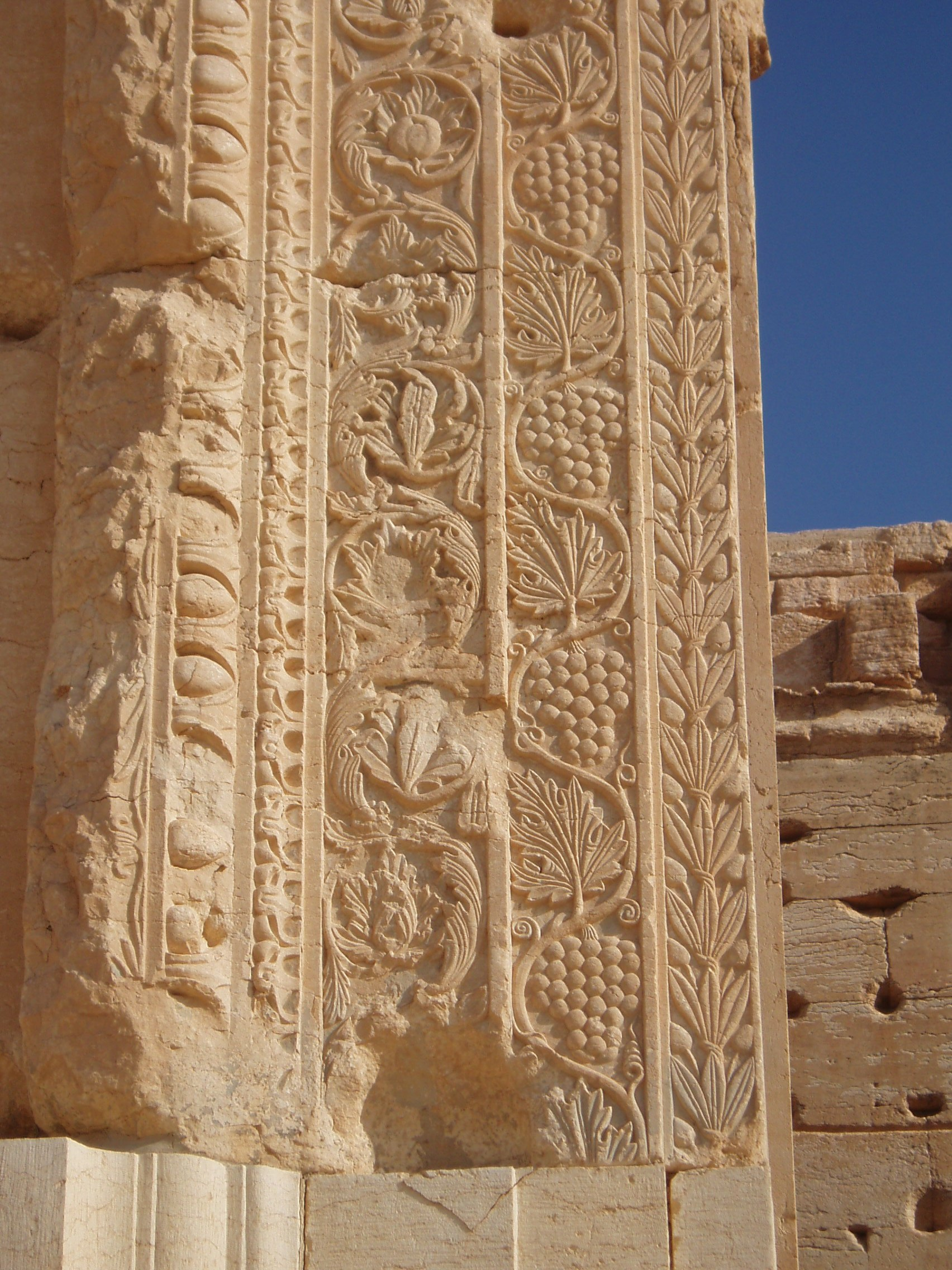
Roman rinceaux of the Temple of Bel, Palmyra, Syria, unknown architect or sculptor, 32 AD

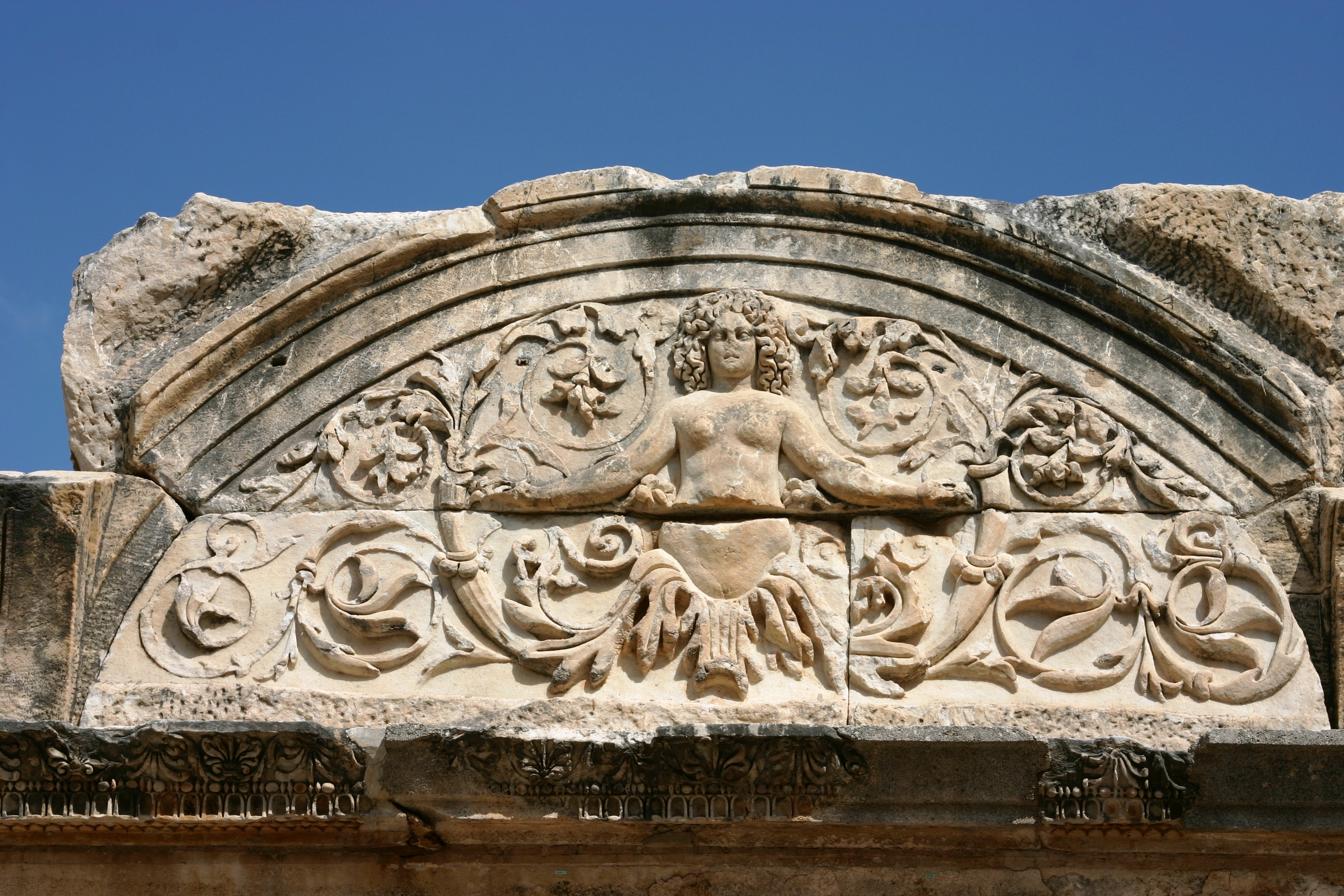
Roman rinceau of the Temple of Hadrianus, Ephesus, Turkey, unknown architect or sculptor, 117-118 AD

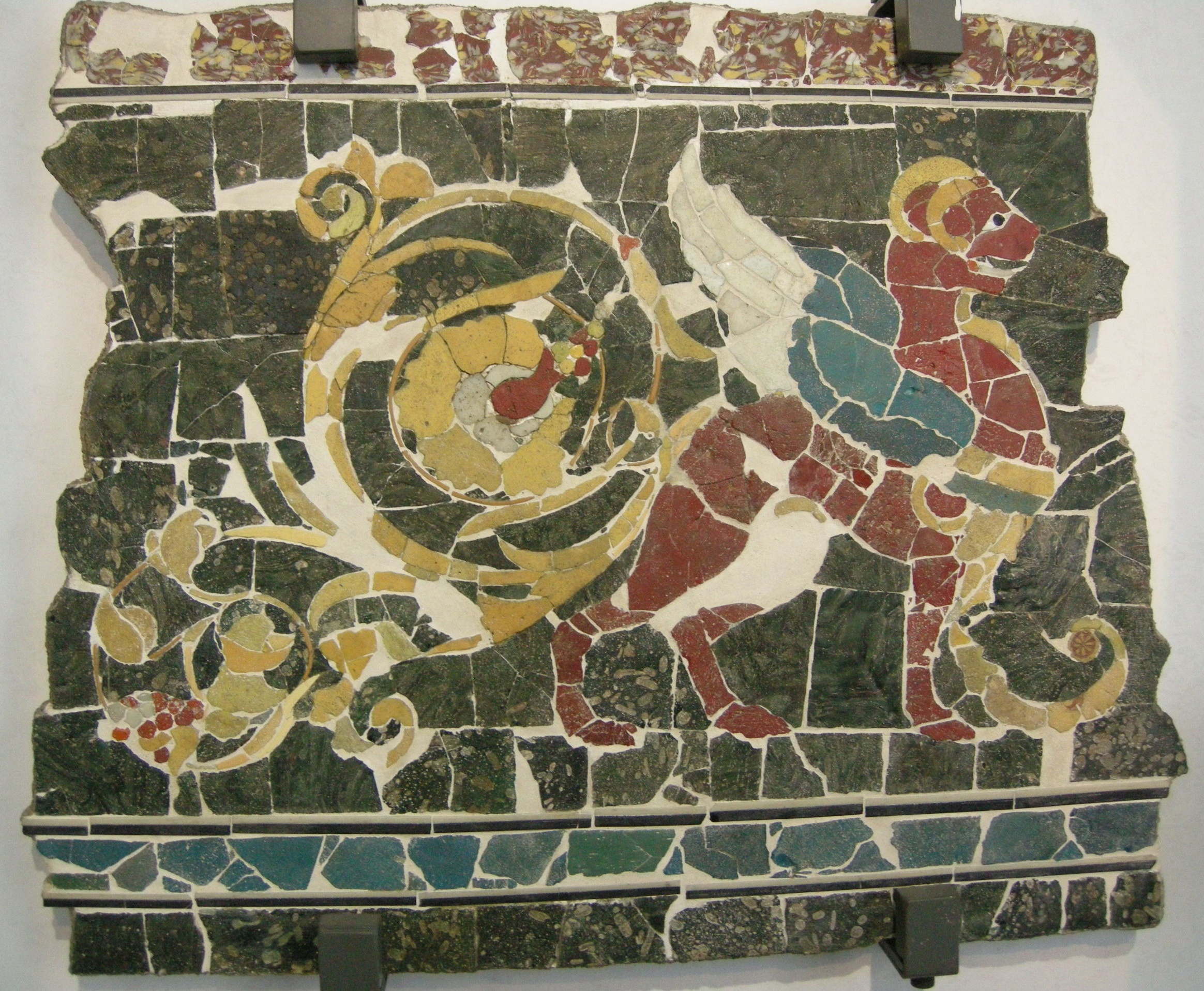
Roman rinceaux on a panel with a griffin from the Villa of Lucio Vero, 2nd century, vitreous paste panel, Palazzo Massimo alle Terme, Rome

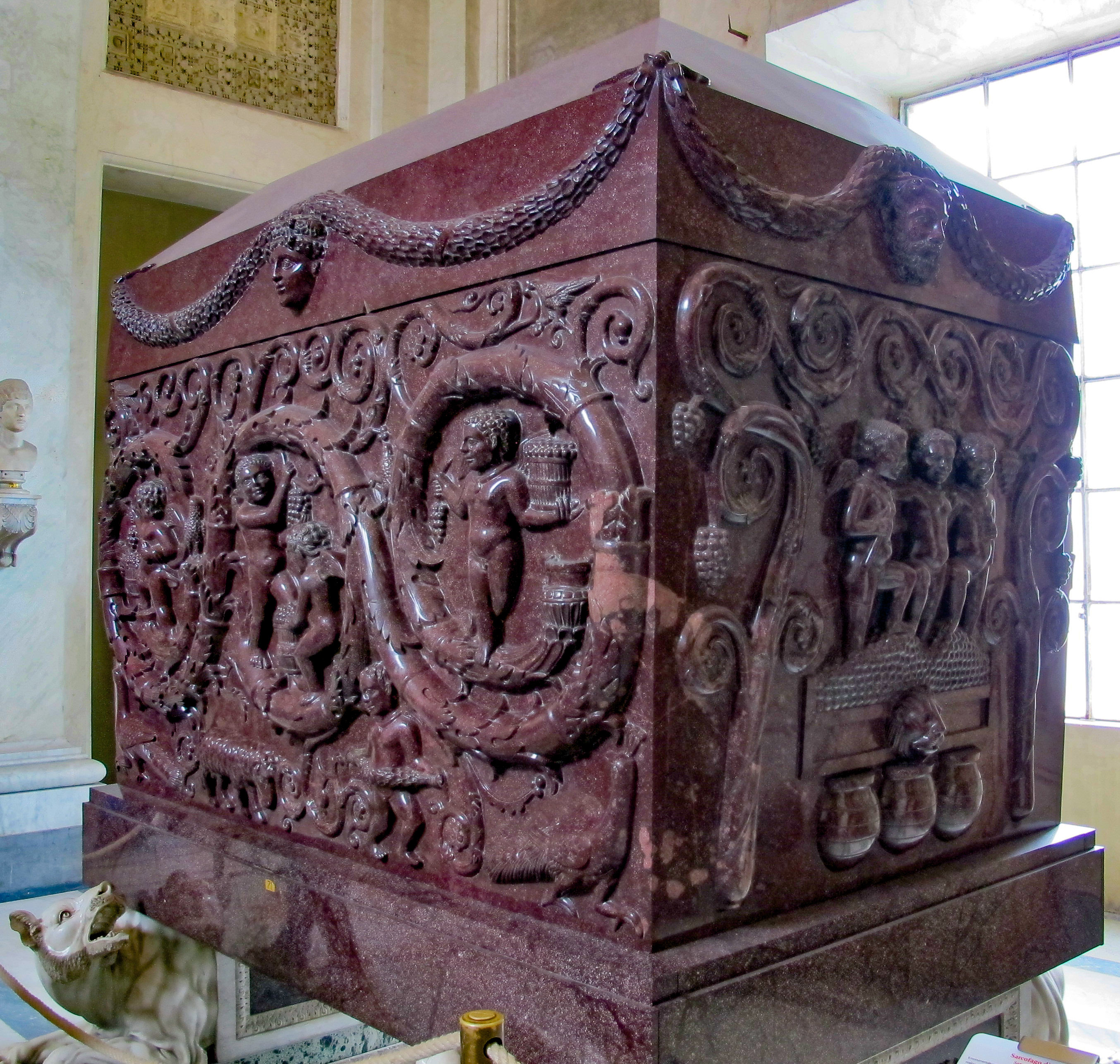
Late Roman-early Byzantine rinceaux on the Sarcophagus of Constantina, c.340, porphyry, Vatican Museums, Vatican City

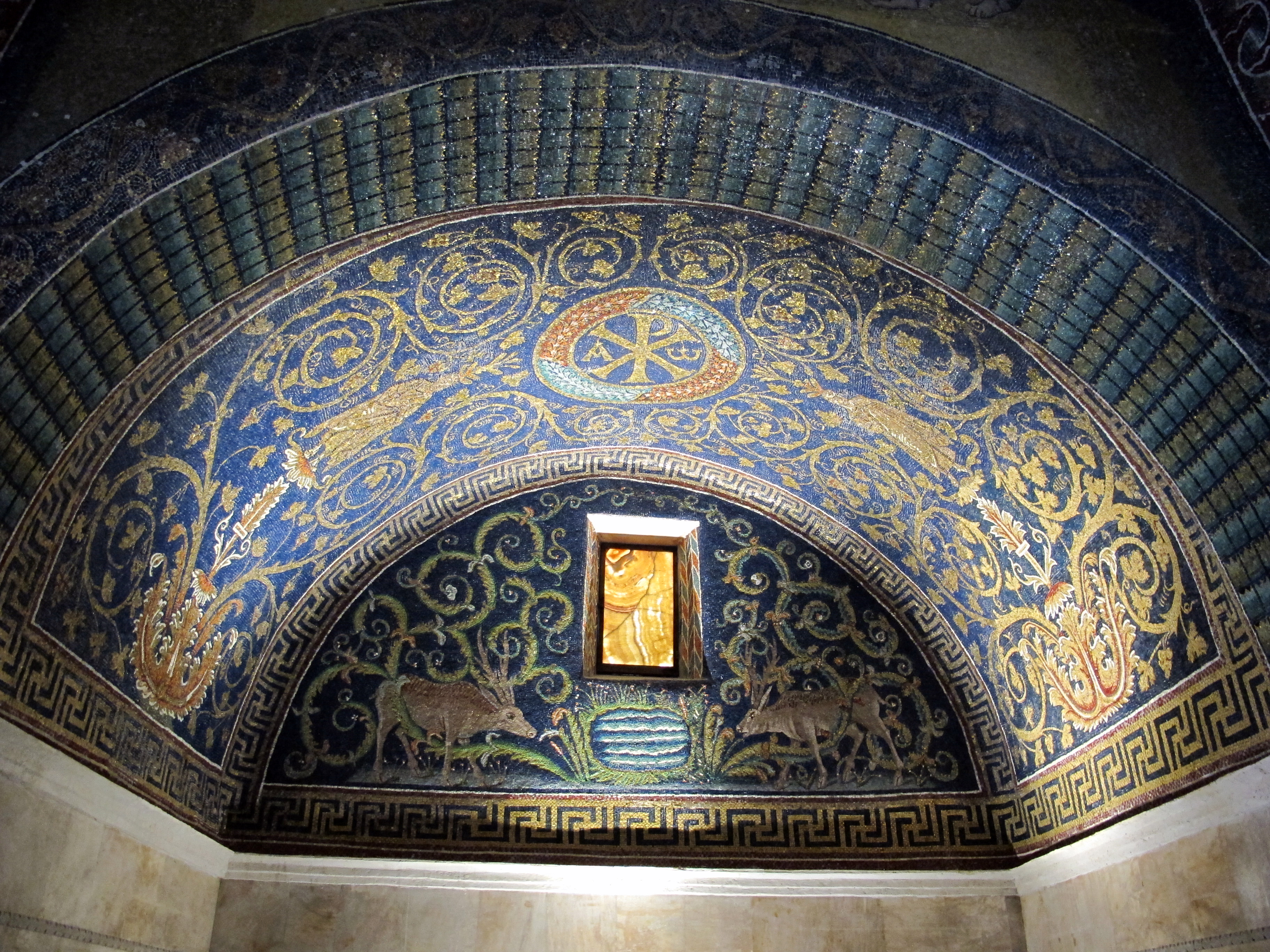
Late Roman-early Byzantine rinceaux in the Mausoleum of Galla Placidia, Ravenna, Italy, unknown architect or craftsman, 425-450

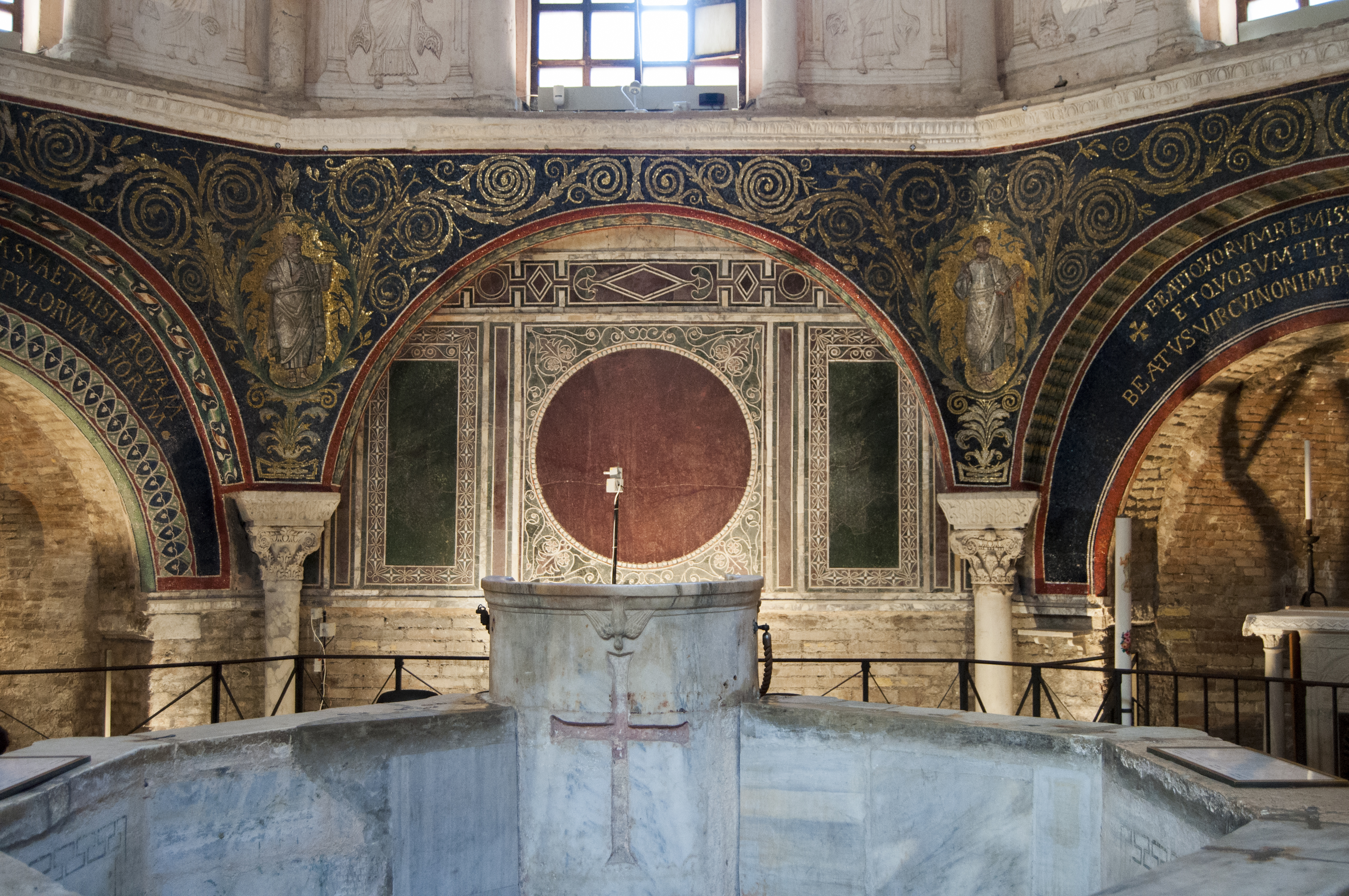
Late Roman-early Byzantine rinceaux in the Baptistery of Neon, Ravenna, unknown architect or craftsman, 5th century

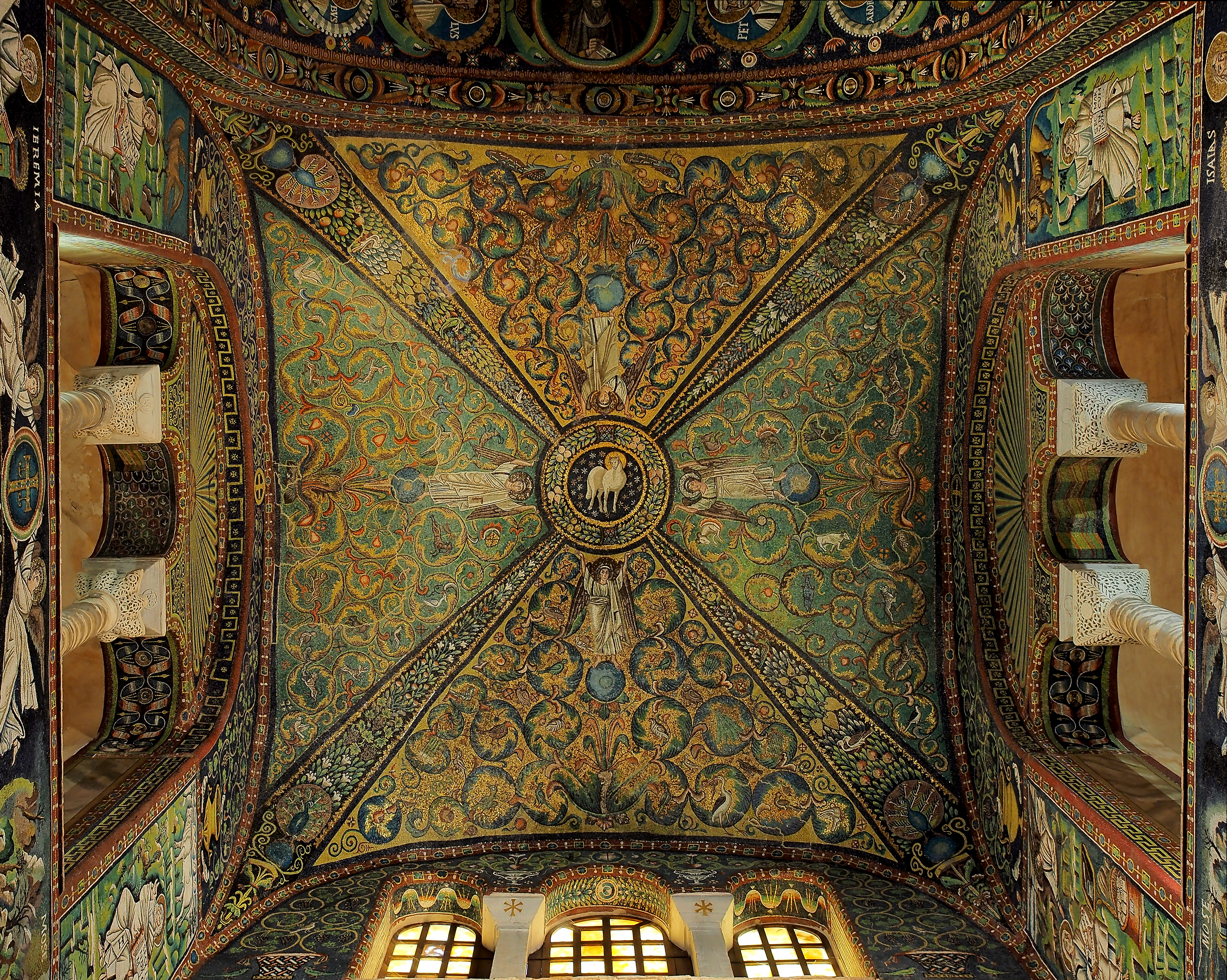
Byzantine rinceaux on a ceiling of Basilica of San Vitale, Ravenna, unknown architect or craftsman, begun in c.532 and consecrated in 548

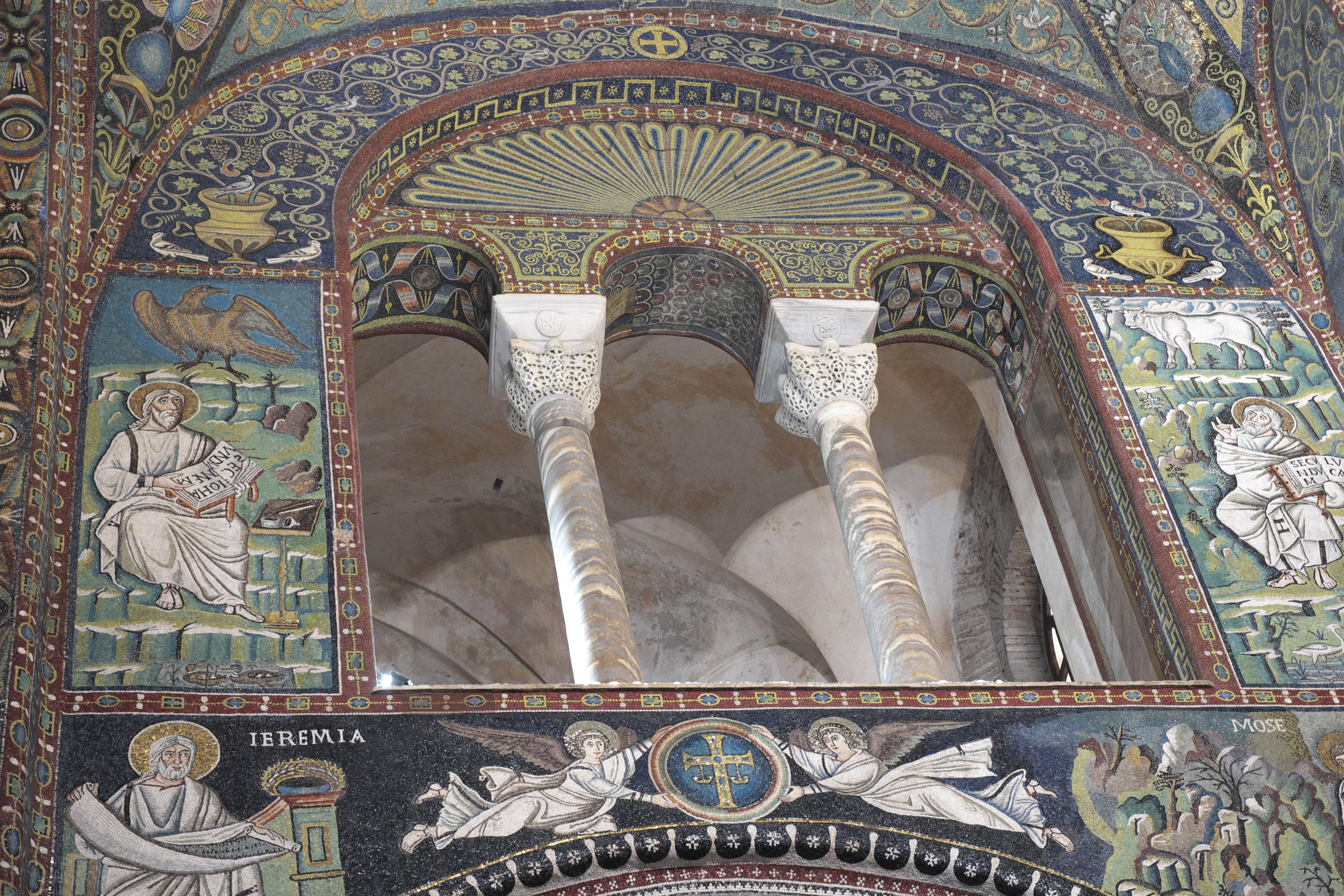
Byzantine rinceaux on a ceiling of Basilica of San Vitale, unknown architect or craftsman, begun in c.532 and consecrated in 548

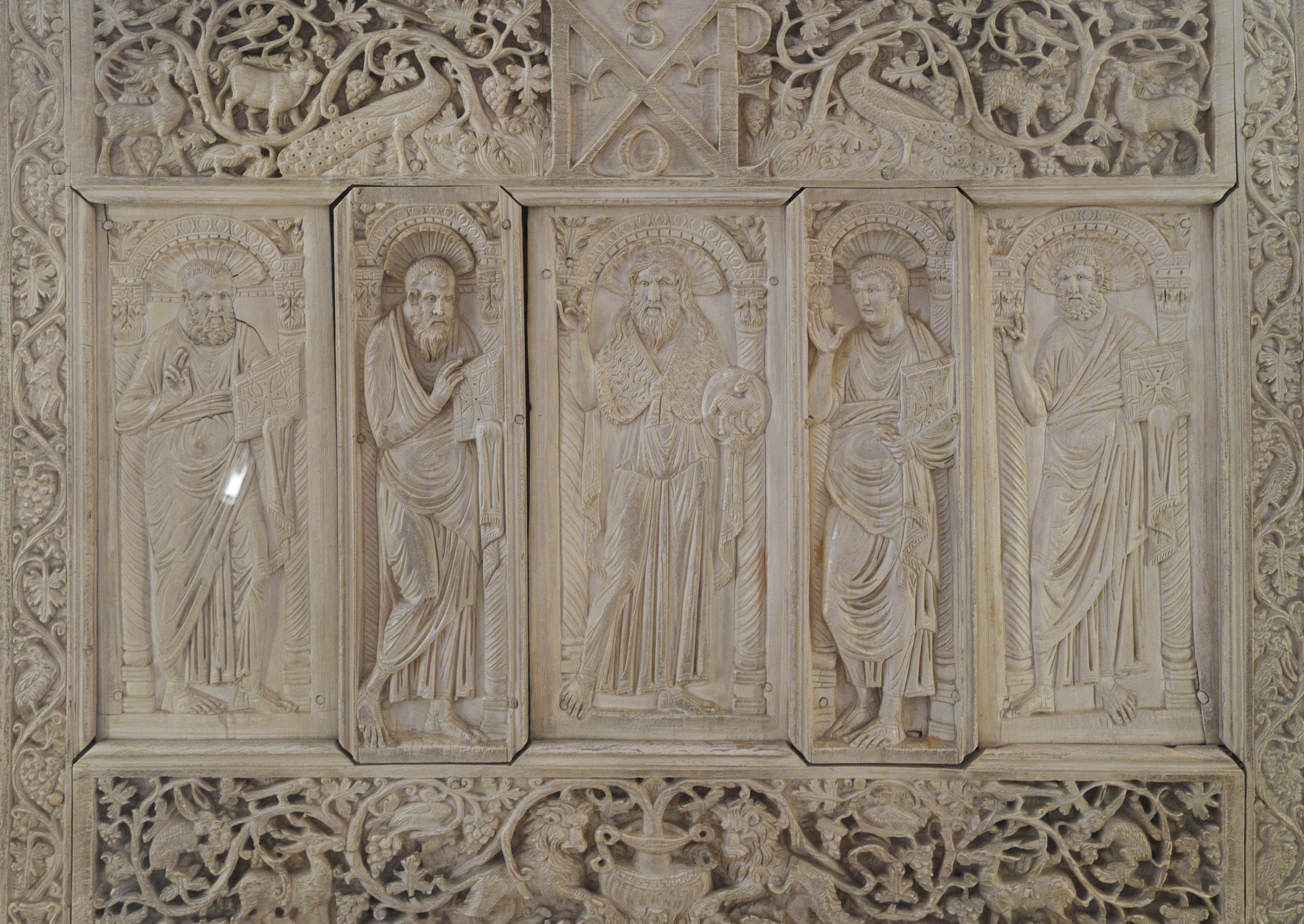
Byzantine rinceaux with animals on the Throne of Archbishop Maximian of Ravenna, 546-556, ivory, Archiepiscopal Museum, Ravenna

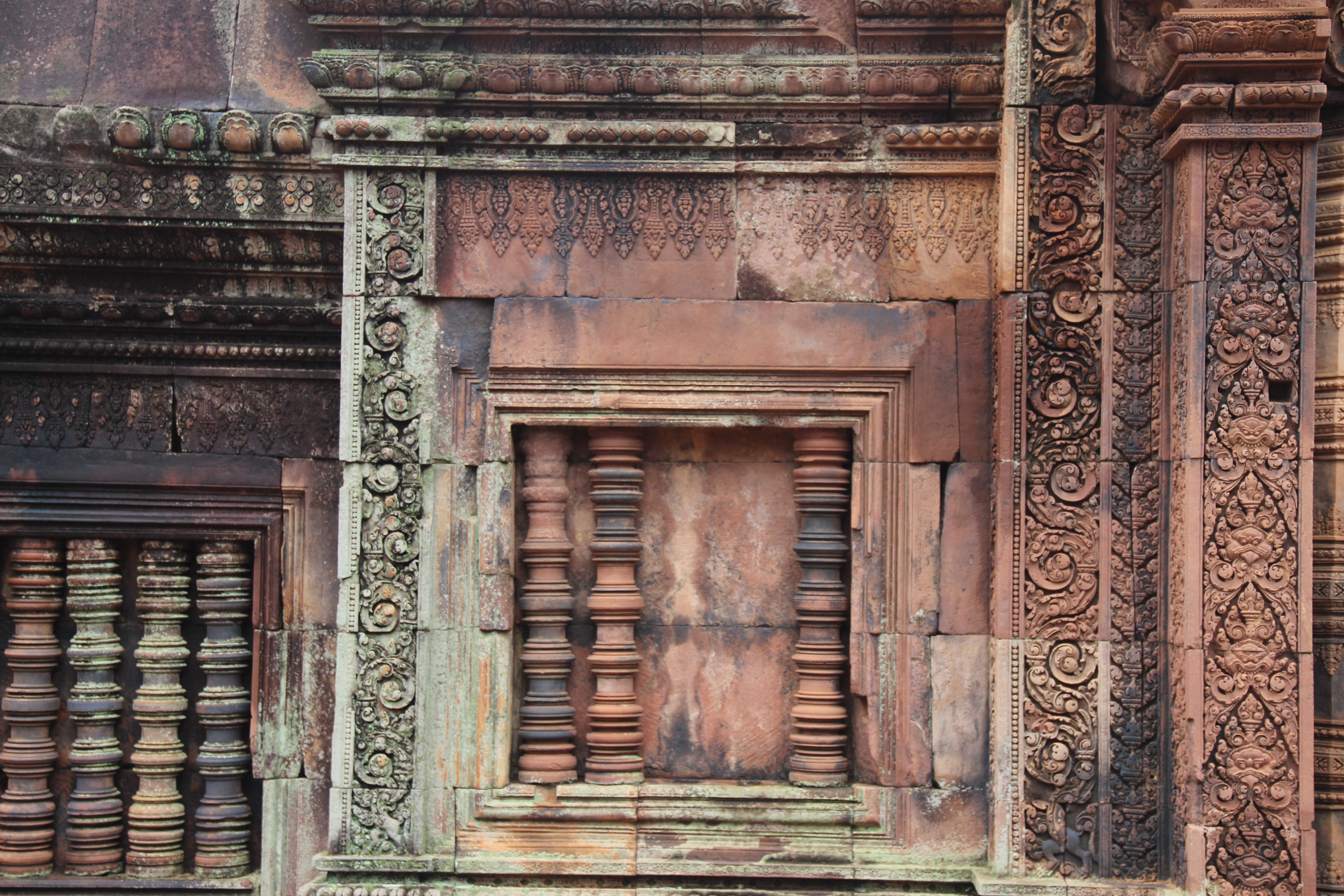
Khmer rinceaux on Banteay Srei, Siem Reap province, Cambodia, unknown architect or sculptor, 10th century

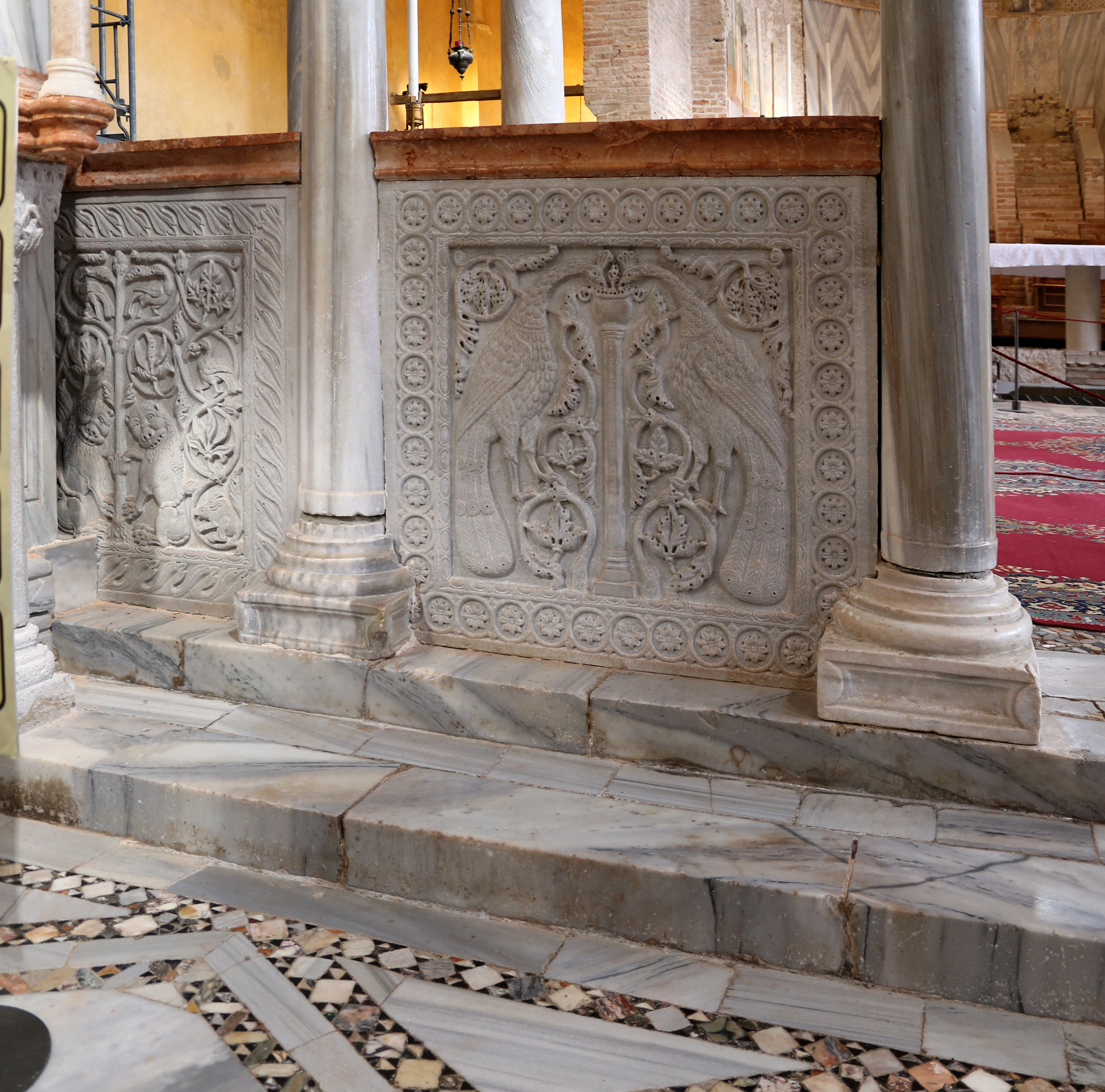
Byzantine rinceaux on a panel with peacocks, c.1100, marble, Church of Santa Maria Assunta, Torcello, Italy

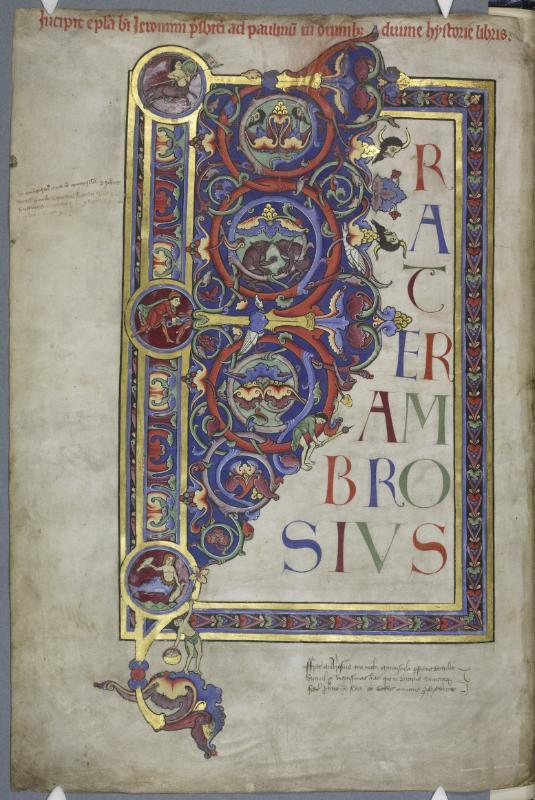
Romanesque rinceaux on a page from the Bury Bible, by Master Hugo, c.1135-1140, illumination on parchment, Corpus Christi College, University of Cambridge, the UK

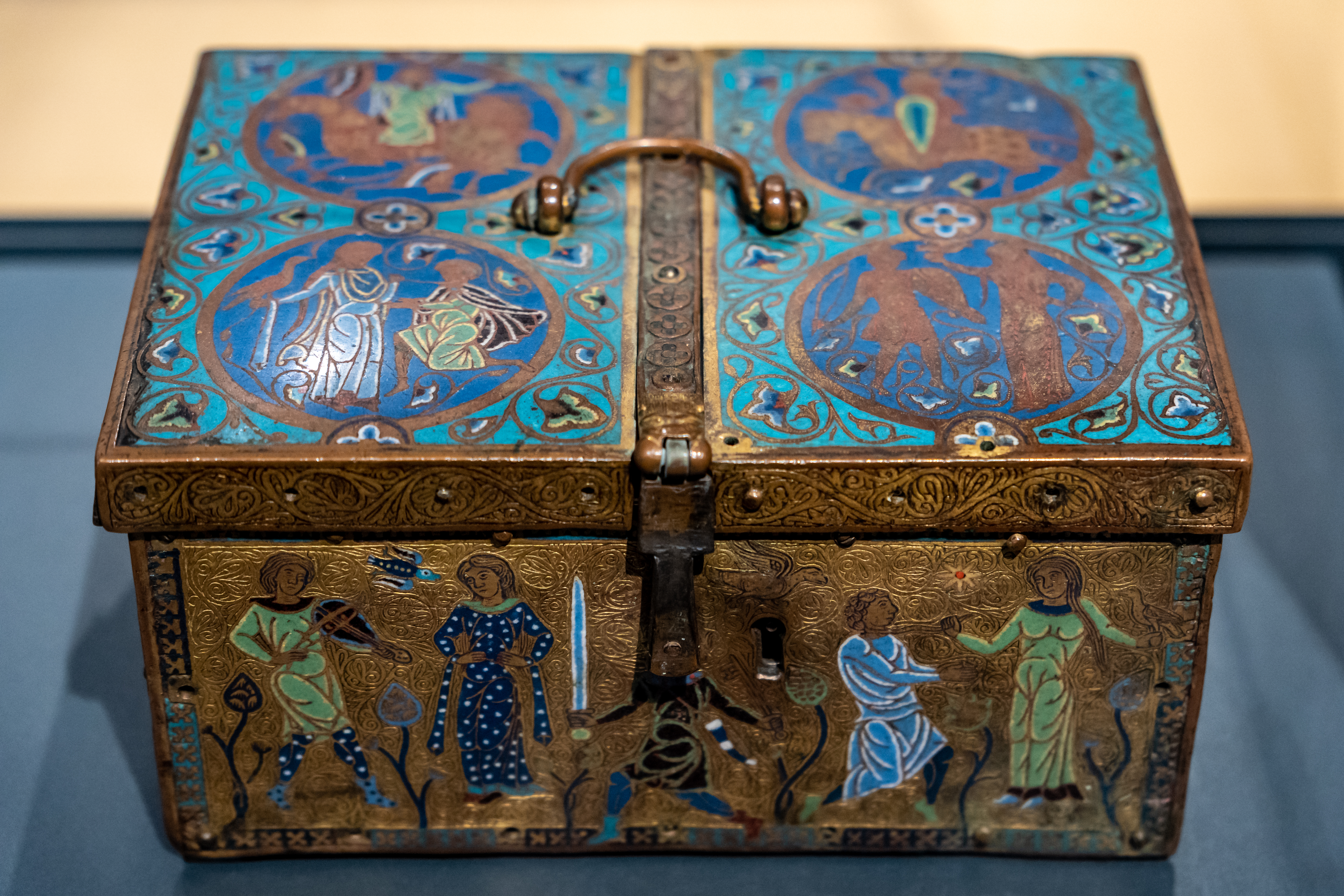
Romanesque rinceaux on a casket of courtly love, both on the lid and on the rest, c.1180, champlevé enamel om gilded copper, British Museum, London

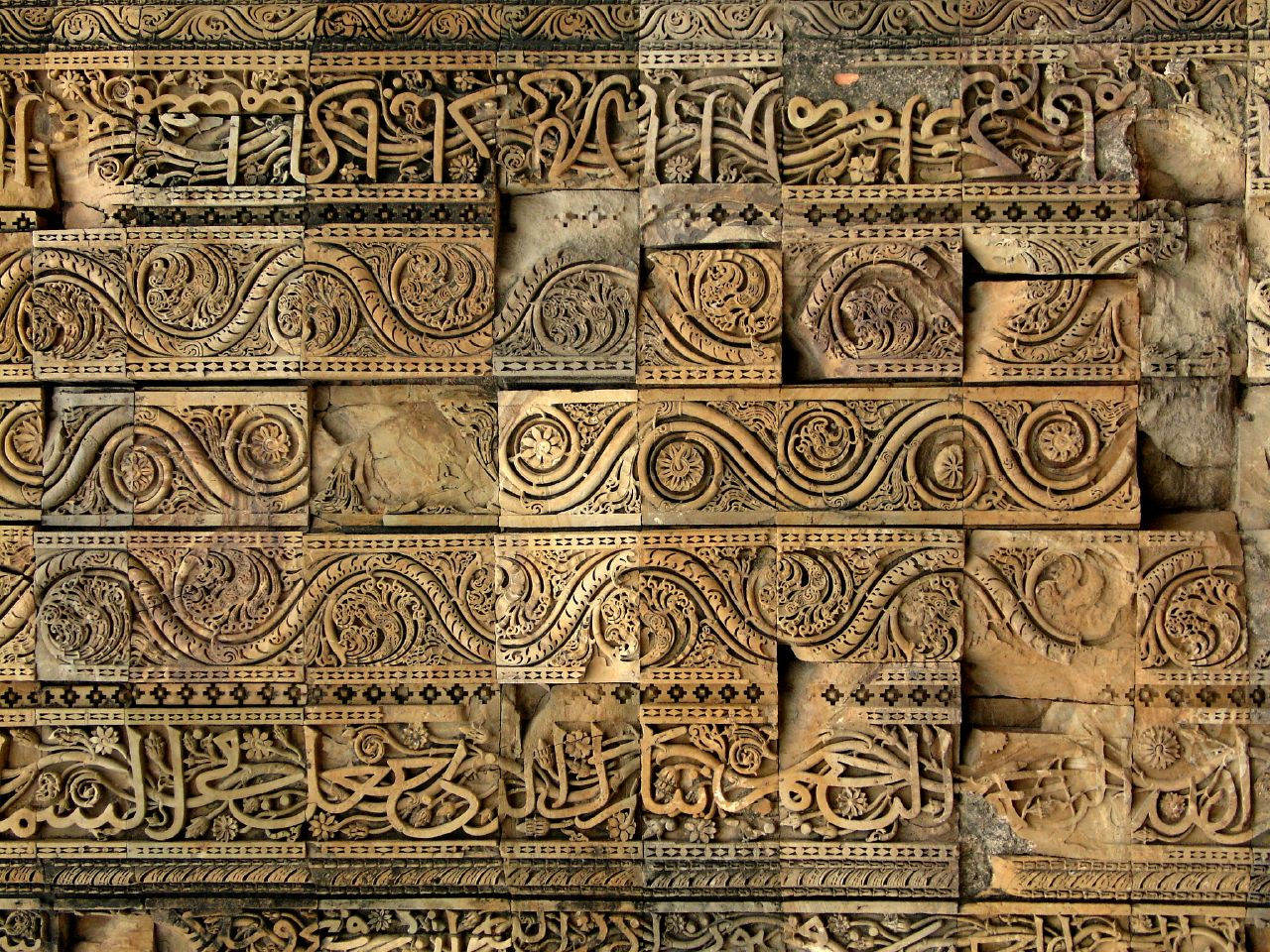
Mughal rinceaux on the Quwwat ul-Islam Mosque from the Qutb Minar complex, Delhi, India, unknown architect, 1198

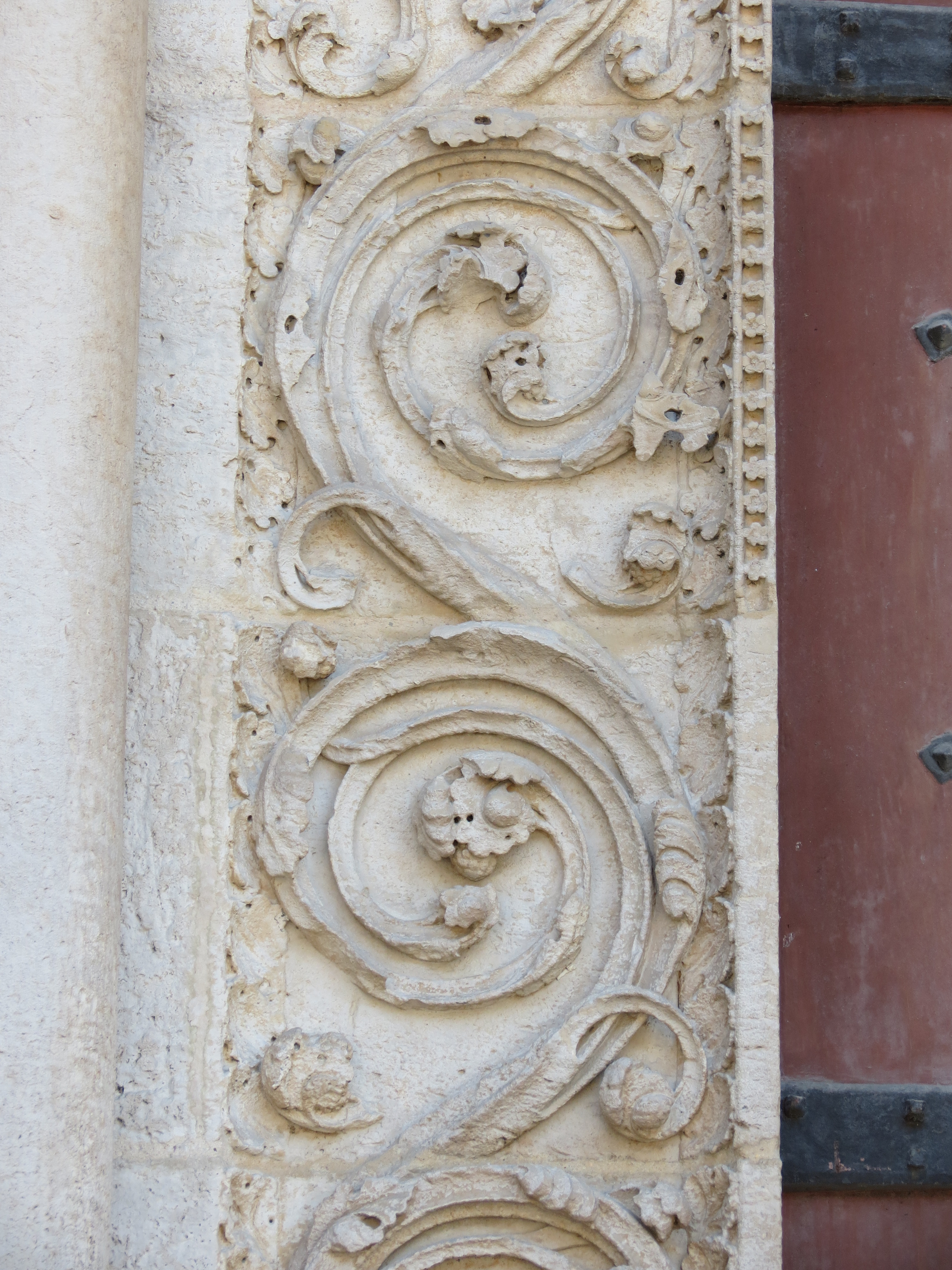
Gothic rinceaux next to the door of the Rouen Cathedral, Rouen, France, unknown architect, 12th century

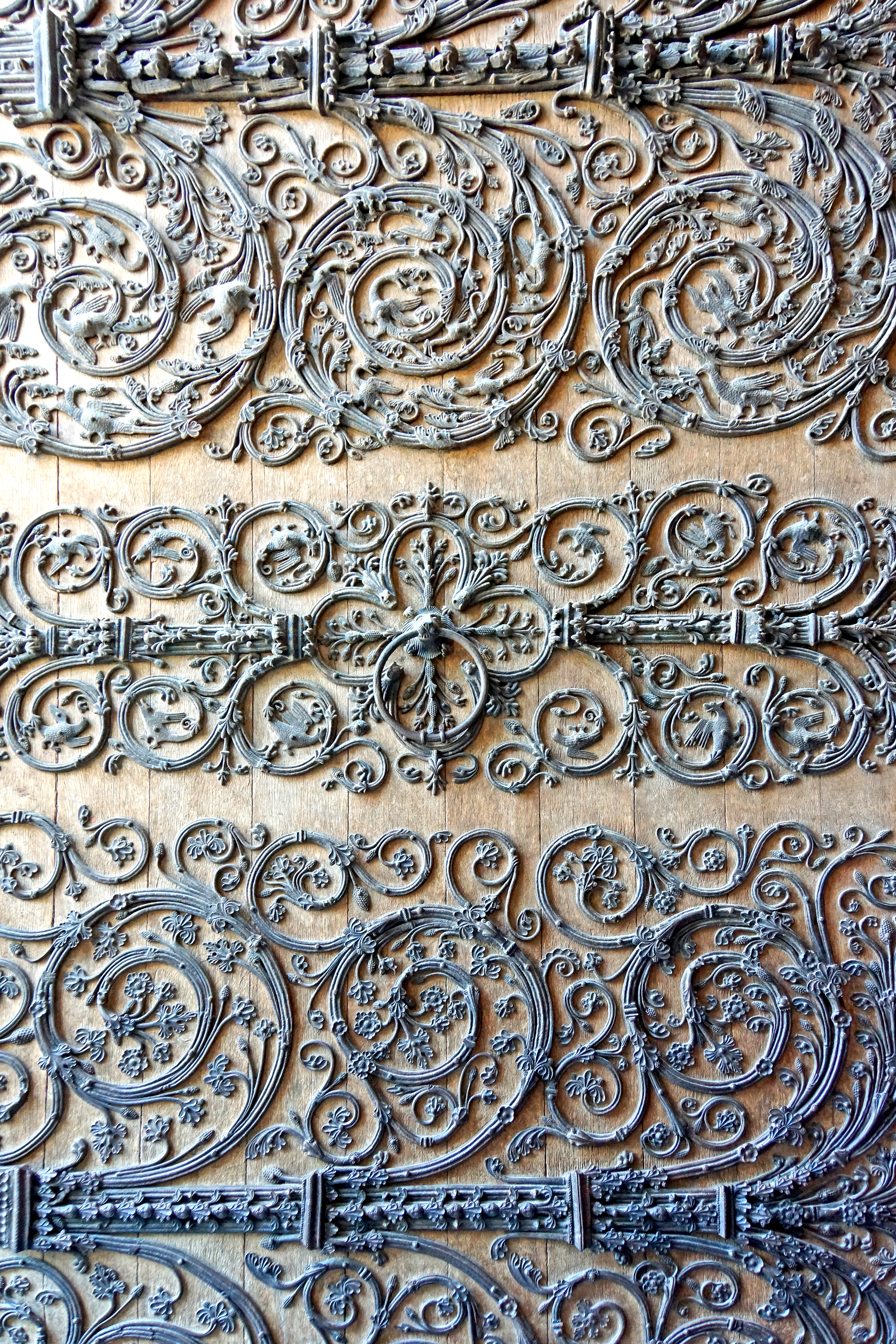
Gothic rinceaux ironwork on a door of the Notre-Dame de Paris, attributed to the locksmith Biscornet, 12th-13th centuries

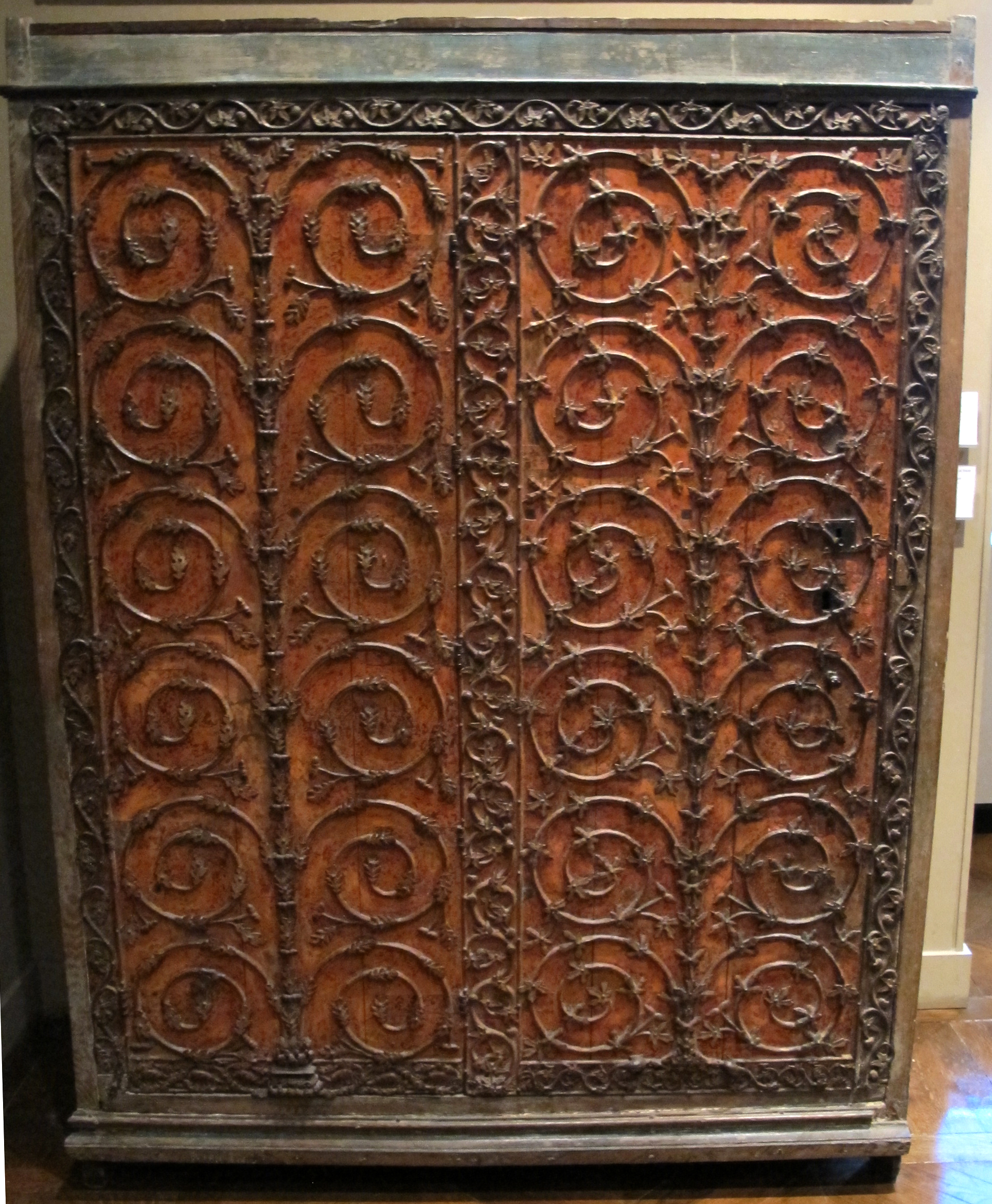
Gothic rinceaux ironwork on an armoire, 14th century, wood and iron, Museum of Decorative Arts, Paris

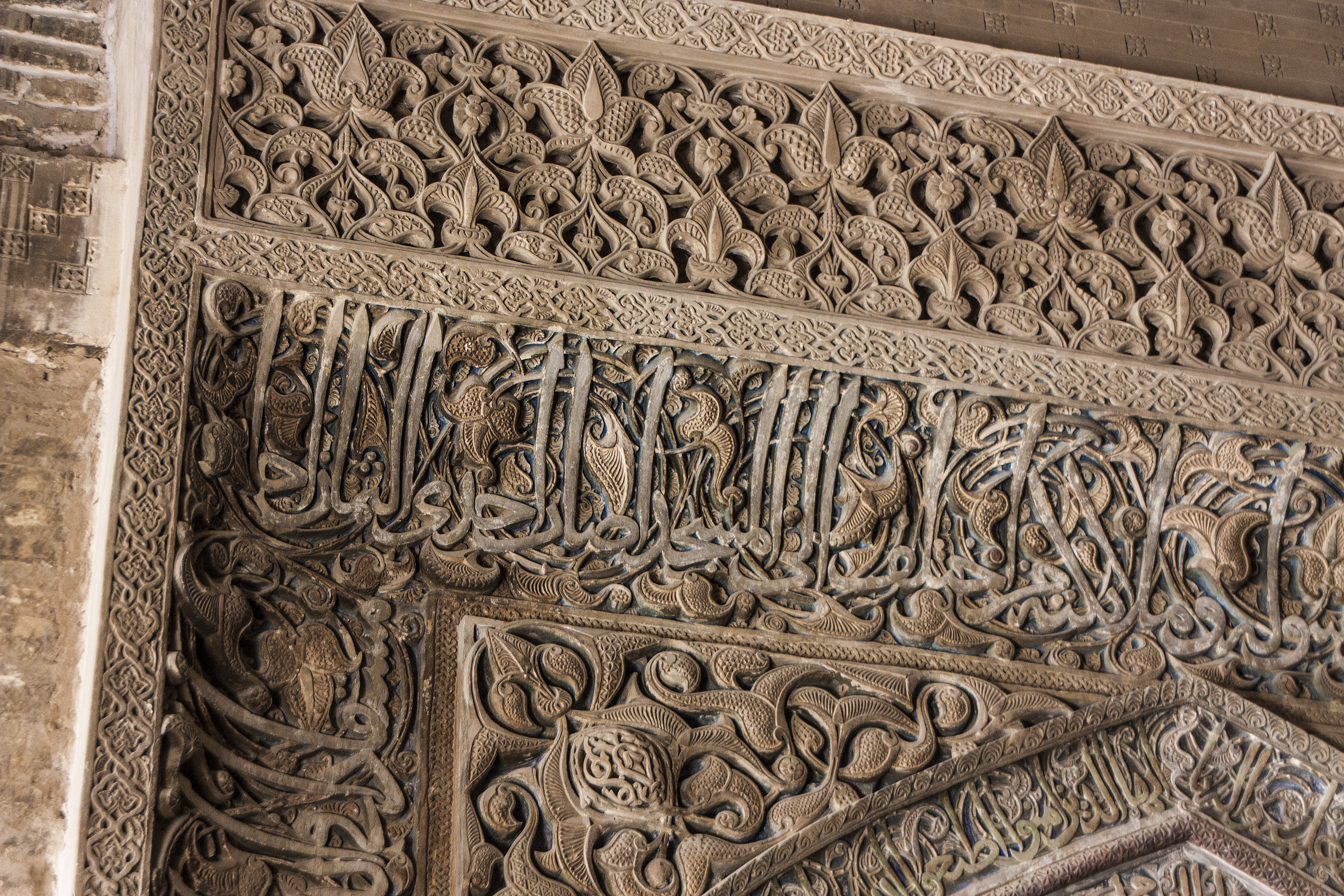
Islamic rinceaux mixed with text, border detail of the stucco mihrab of Öljaitü from the Jameh Mosque of Isfahan, Isfahan, Iran, unknown architect or sculptor, 1310

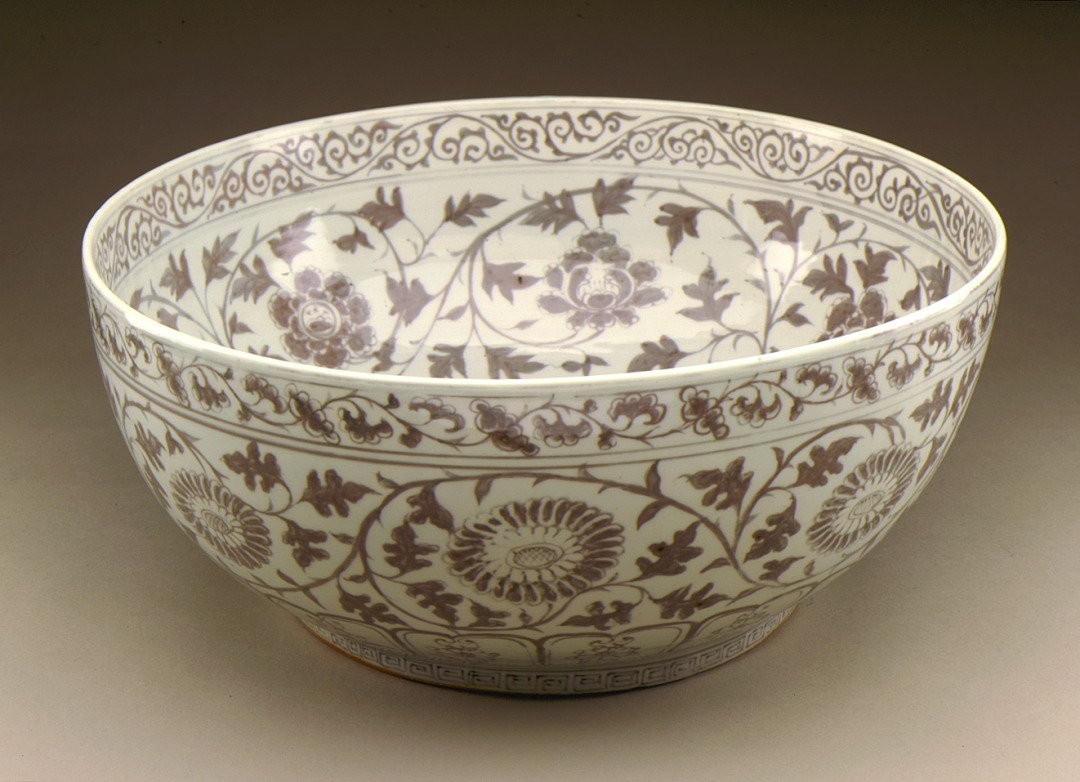
Chinese rinceau on a bowl, 1368-1450, porcelain, Los Angeles County Museum of Art, US

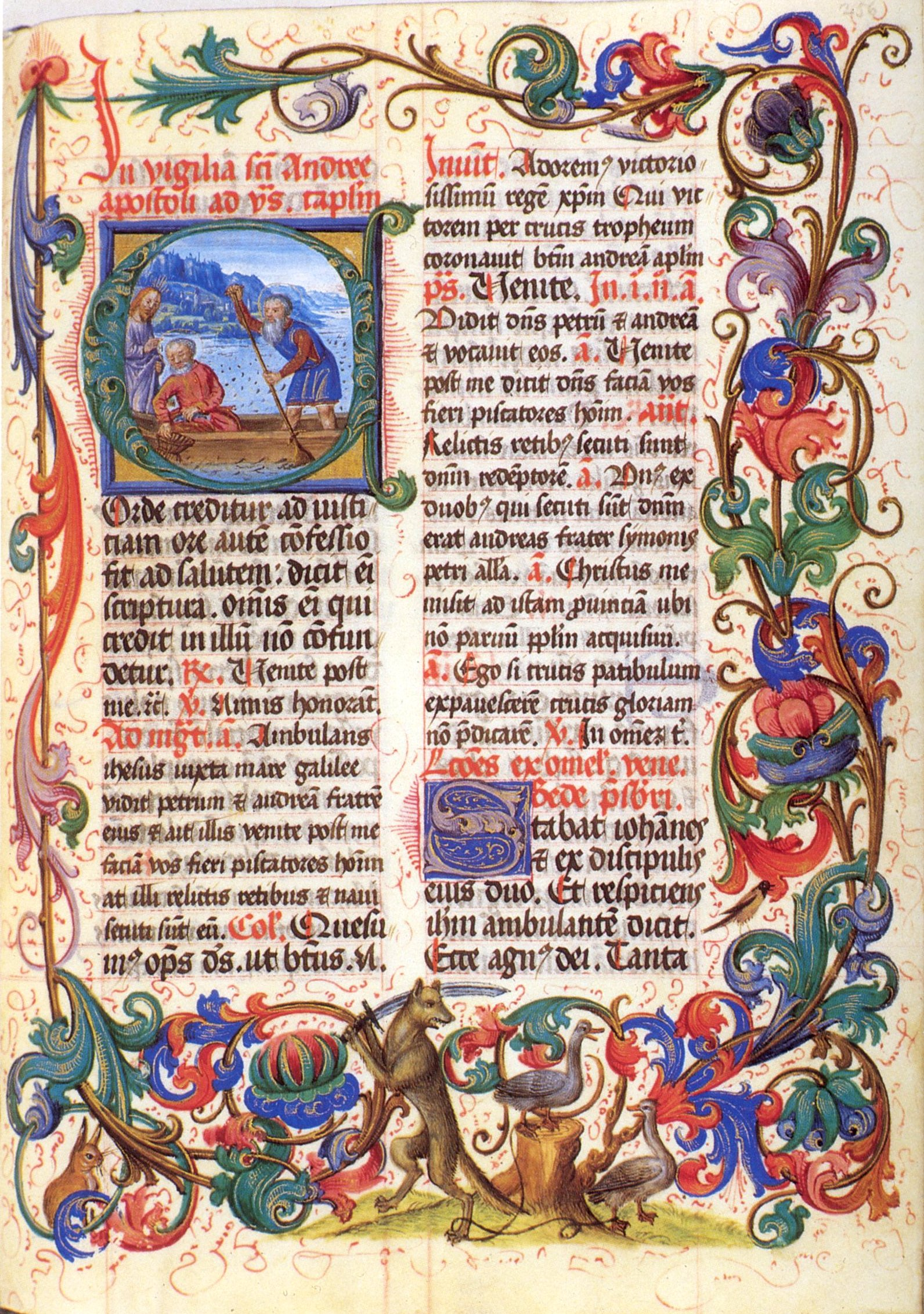
Gothic rinceaux on a page of the Codex Salemitanus IX c, 15th century, tempera colors, gold paint, gold leaf, and ink on parchment, Heidelberg University Library, Heidelberg, Germany

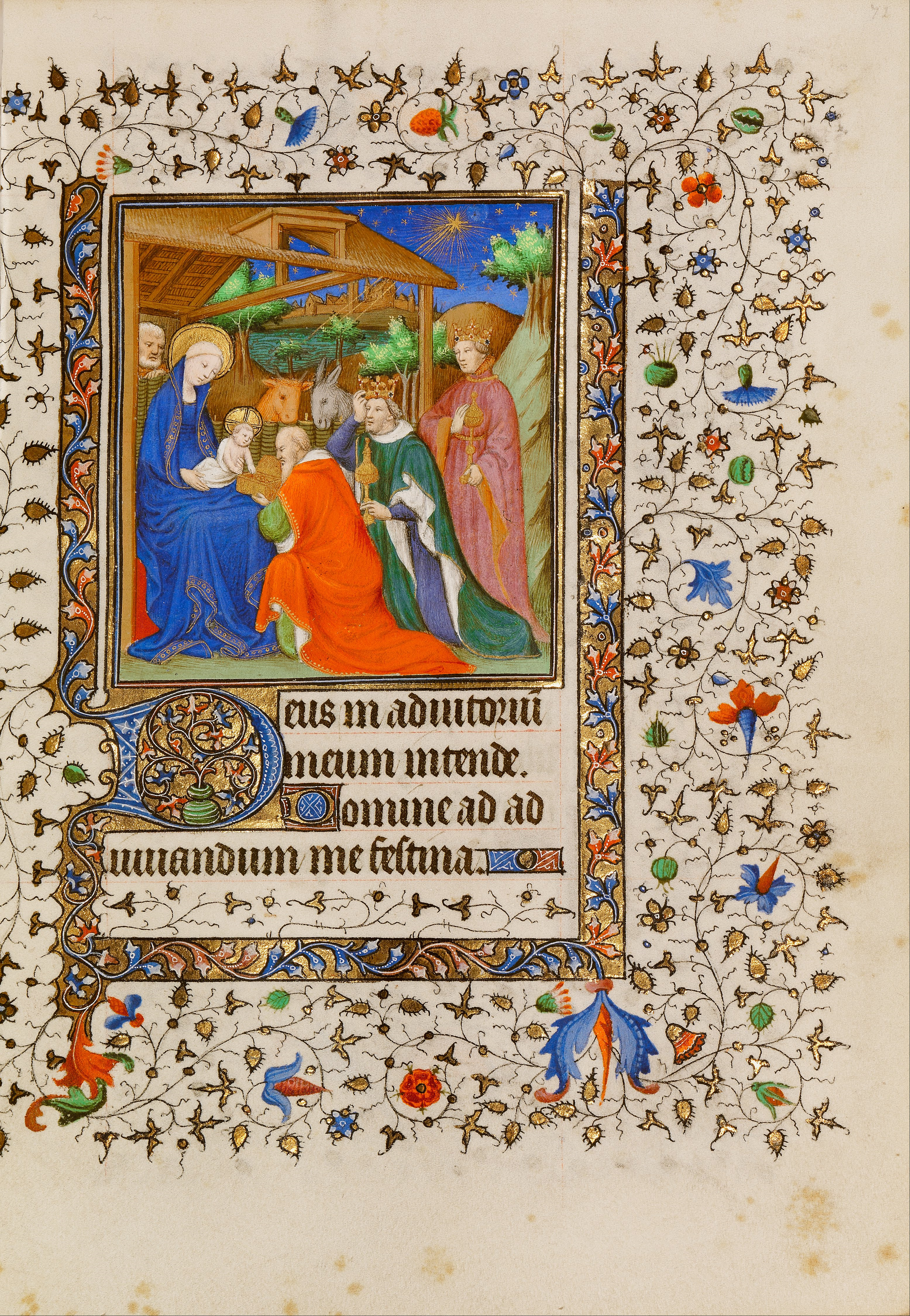
Gothic rinceau on a page with the adoration of the magi from an illuminated manuscript, 1415-1420, tempera colors, gold paint, gold leaf, and ink on parchment, Getty Center, Los Angeles

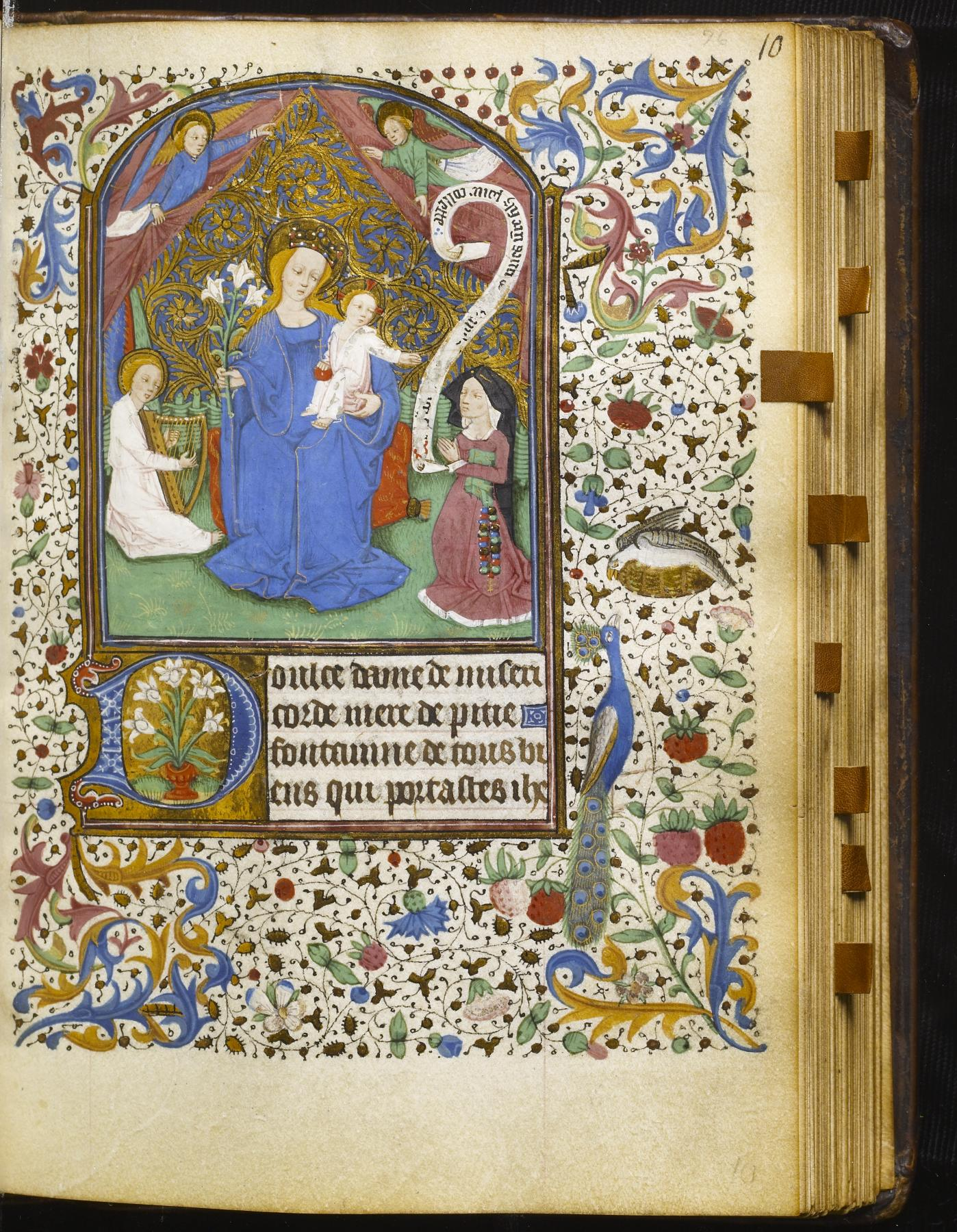
Gothic rinceau on a leaf from a book of hours, c.1460, parchment with ink, paint, and gold, Walters Art Museum, Baltimore, US

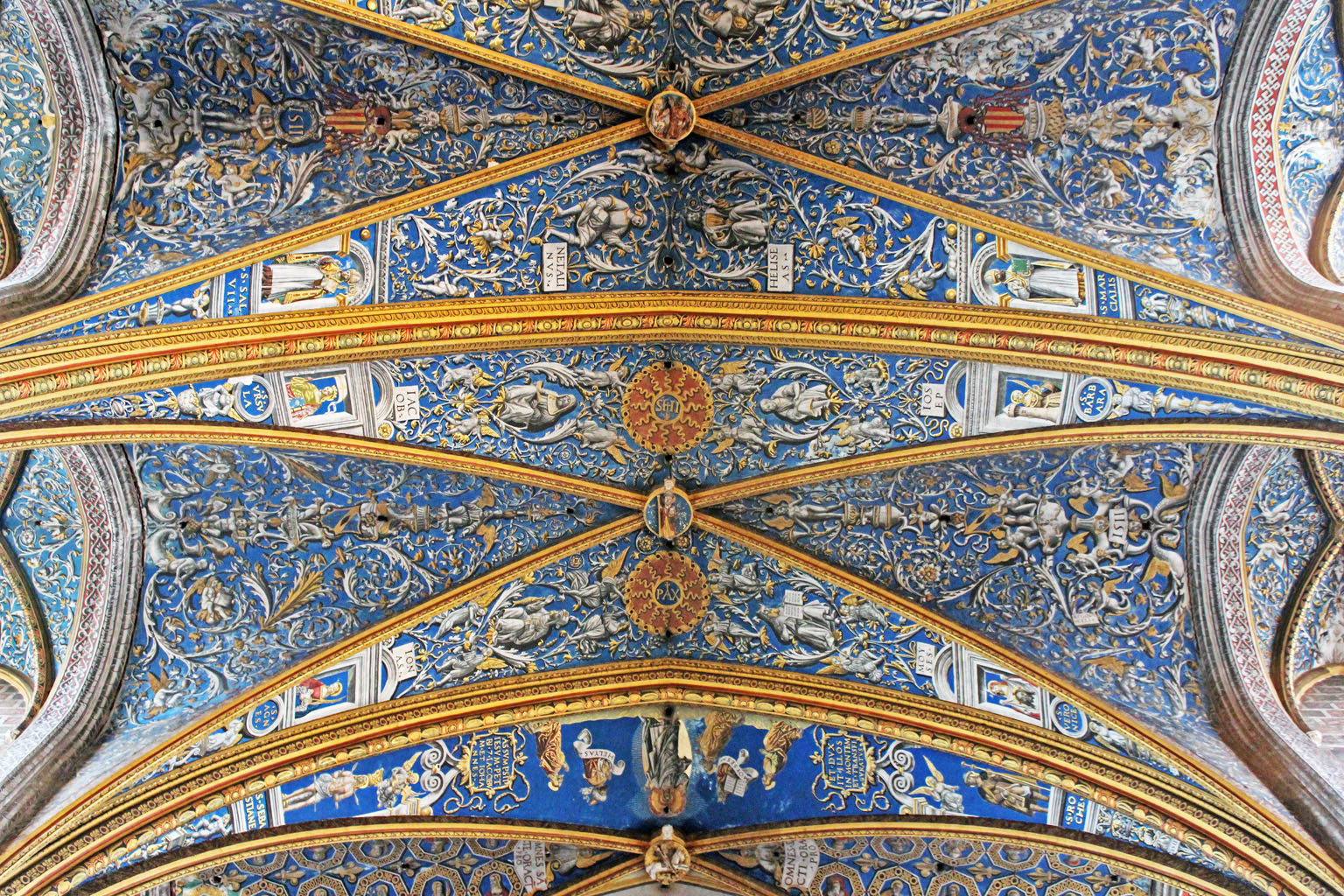
Renaissance rinceaux in the Cathedral Basilica of Saint Cecilia, Albi, France, unknown painter, c.1480

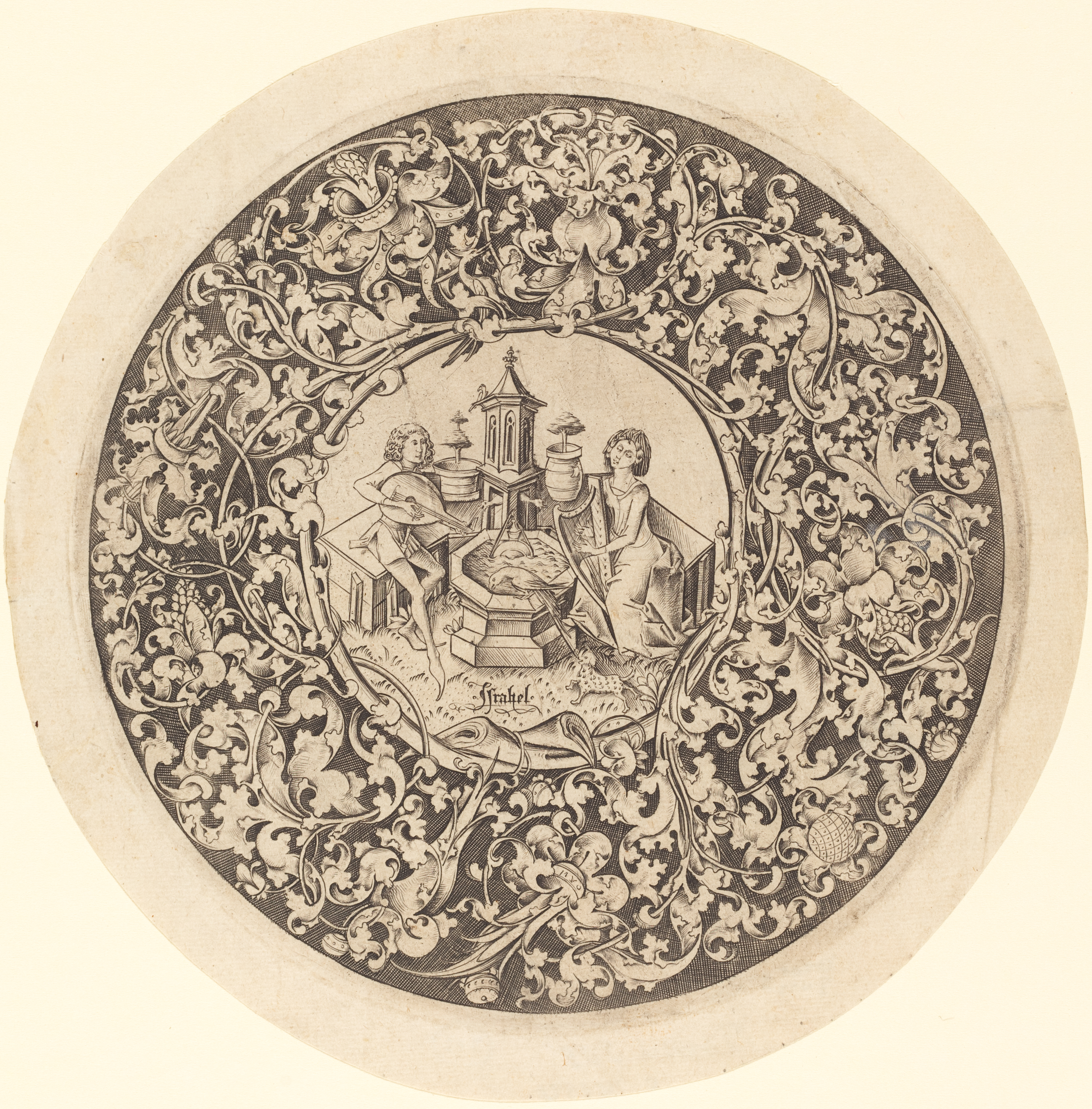
Gothic rinceaux, part of a circular artwork with musicians playing near a well, by Israhel van Meckenem, 1495-1503, engraving, National Gallery of Art, Washington, D.C., US

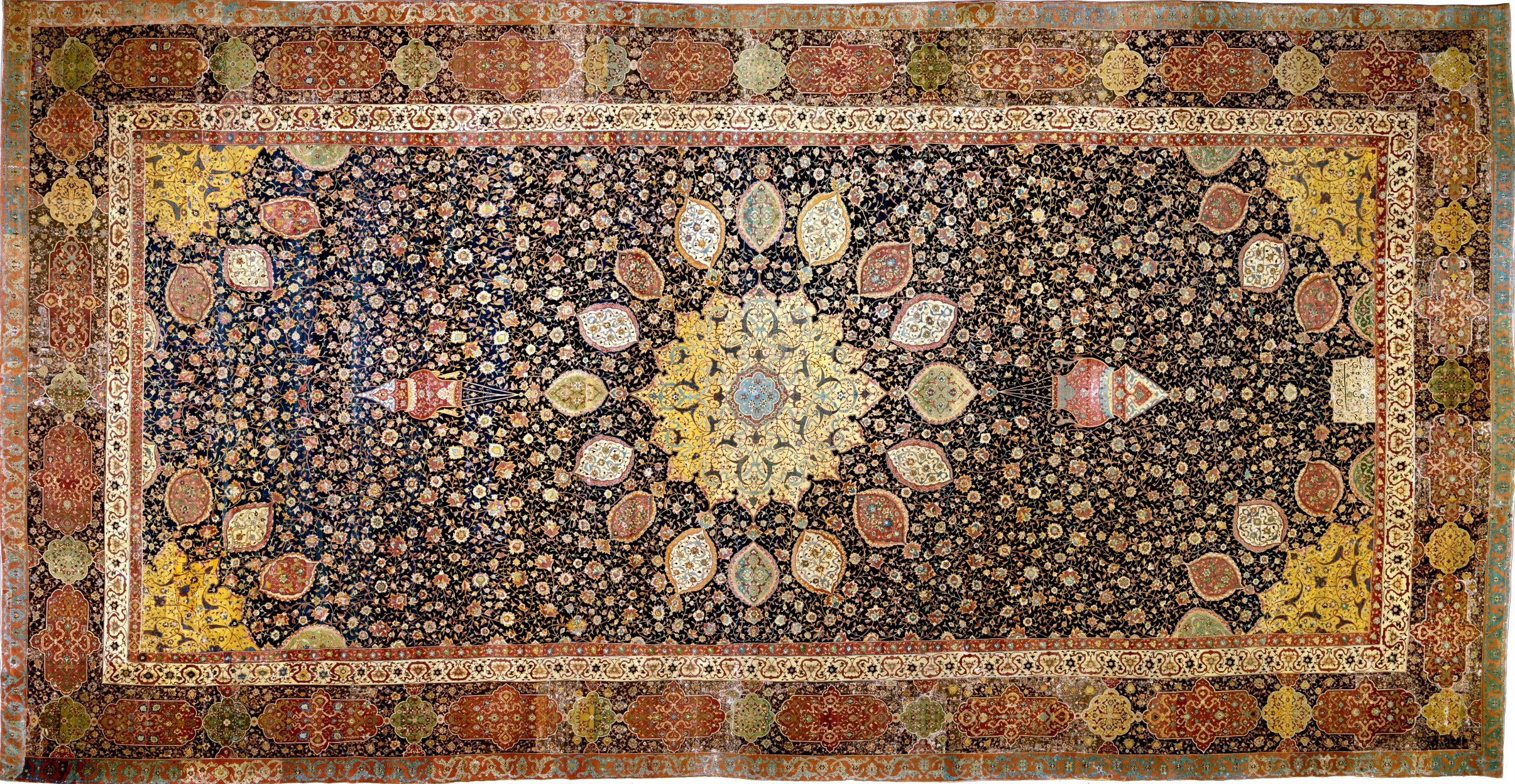
Safavid rinceau on the Ardabil Carpet, by Maqsud of Kashan, 1539-1540, wool and silk, Victoria and Albert Museum, London

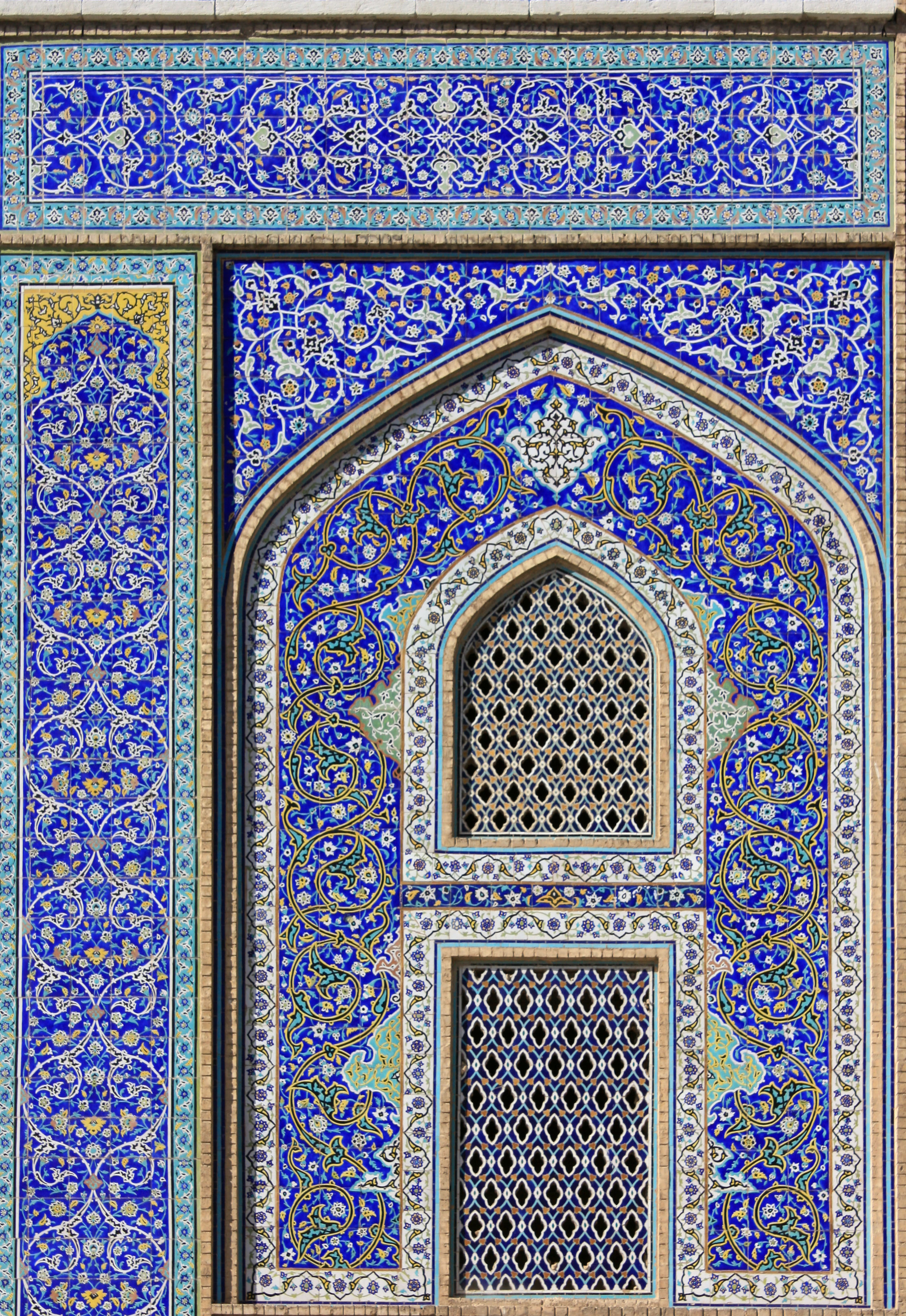
Islamic rinceaux of the Sheikh Lotfollah Mosque, Isfahan, Iran, designed by architect Ostad Mohammad Reza Isfahani, 1603-1619

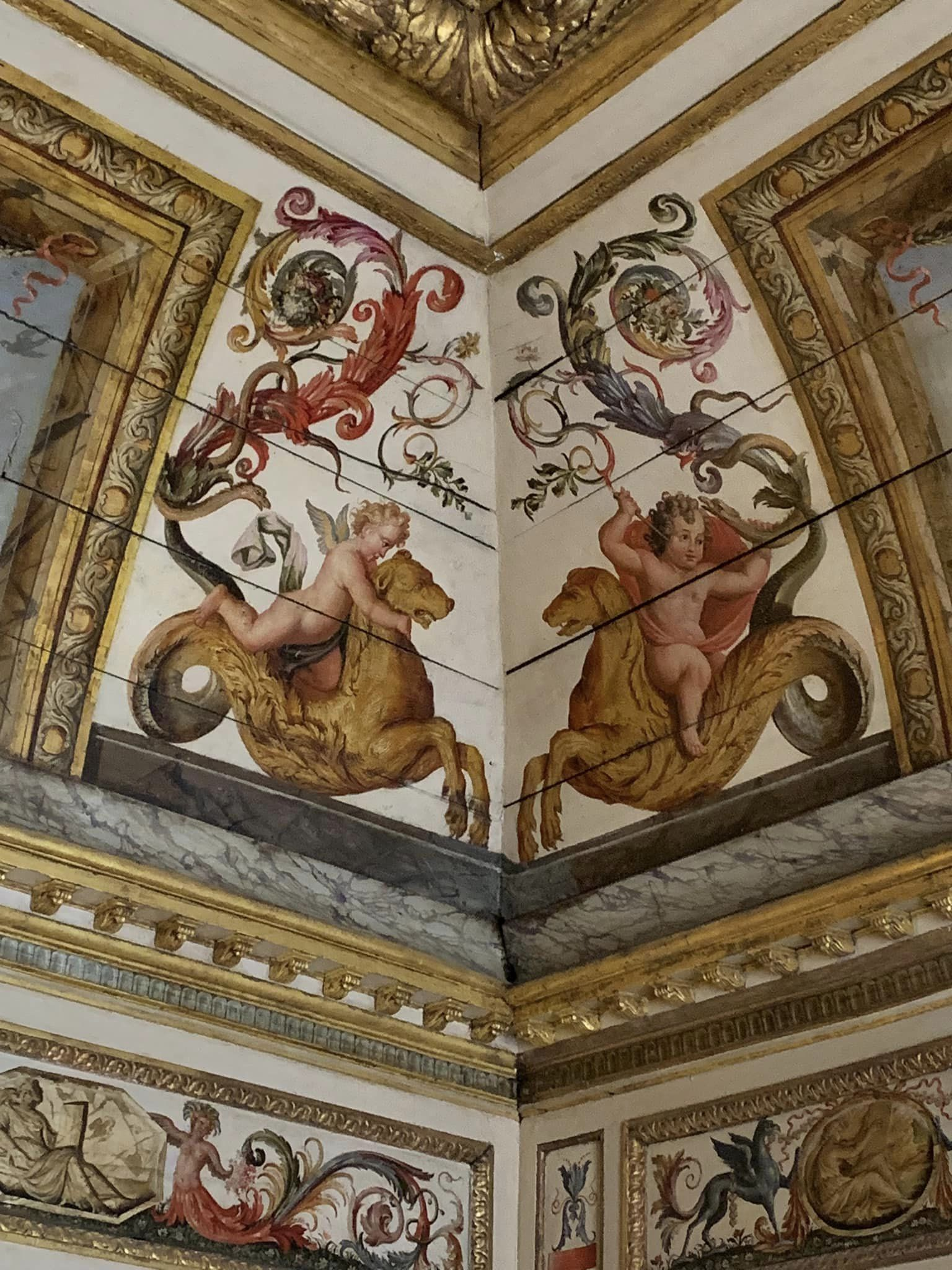
Baroque rinceaux with putti painted on the boiserie of a room from the Hôtel Colbert de Villacerf, now in the Musée Carnavalet, Paris, unknown architect, sculptor and painter, c.1650

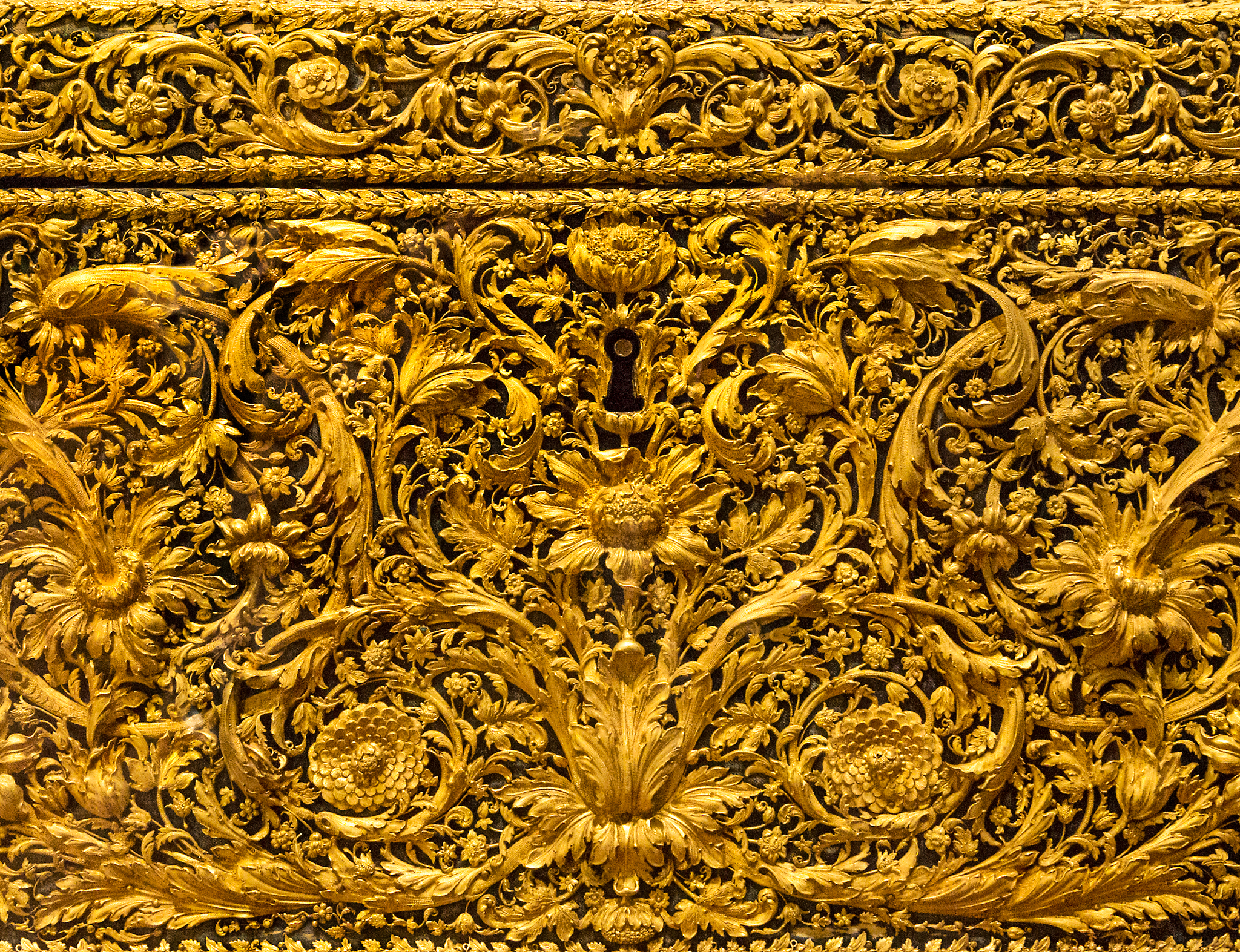
Baroque rinceaux on the chest for Louis XIV's gems, mid-17th century, repoussé and chiselled gold over a wooden core, Louvre

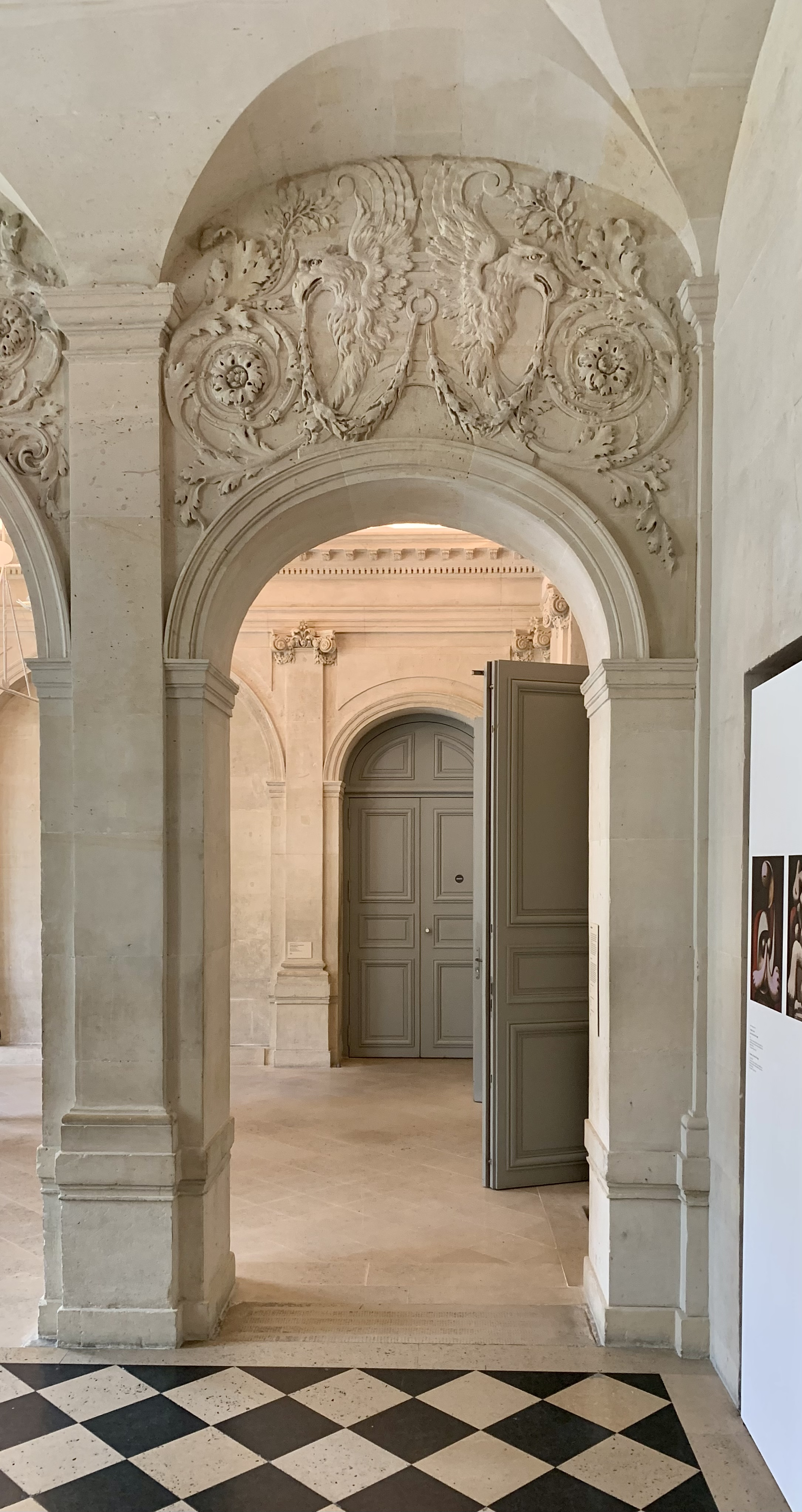
Baroque rinceaux in the Hôtel Salé (now the Musée Picasso), Paris, designed by Jean Boulier de Bourges, 1656-1659

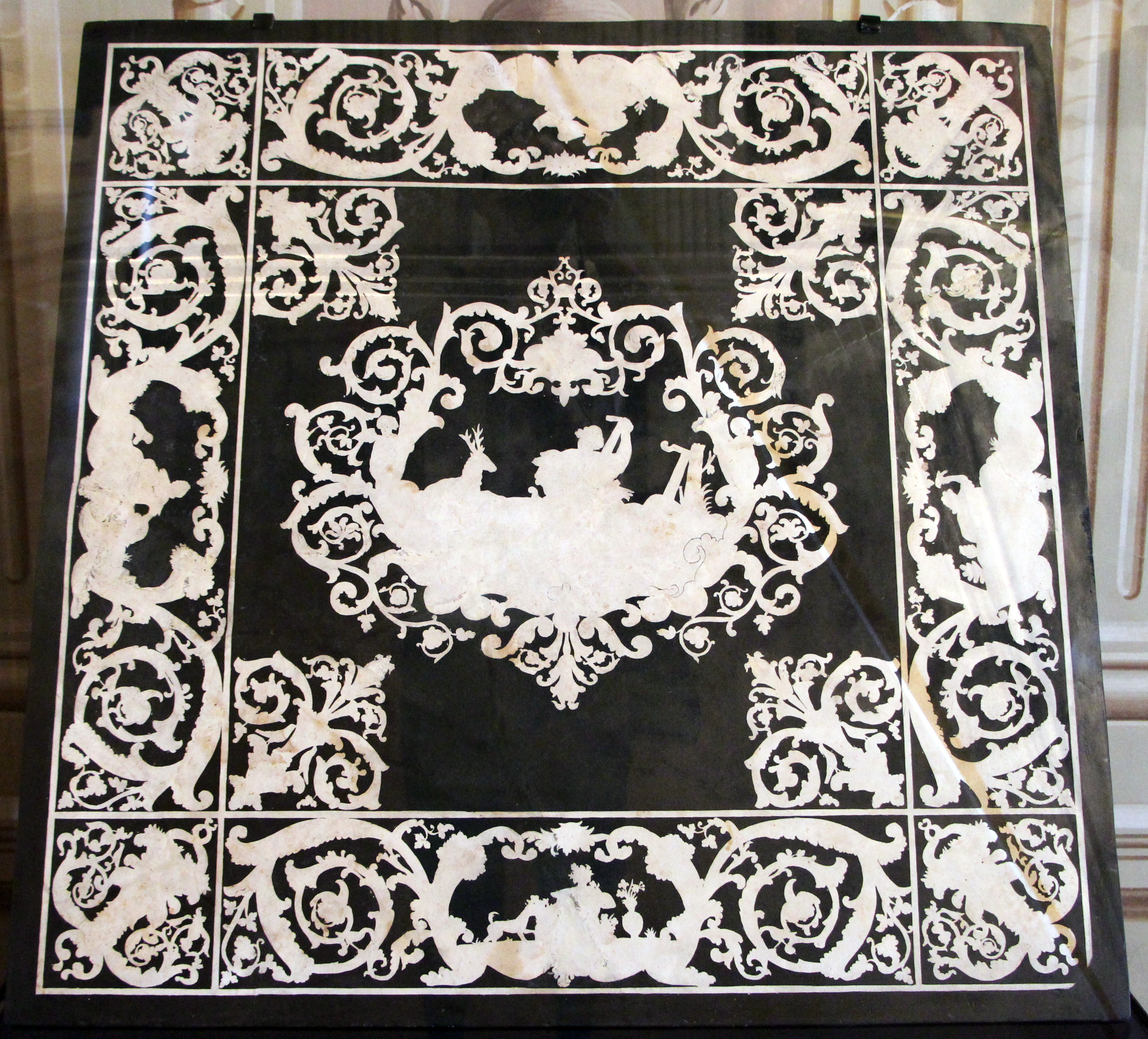
Baroque rinceaux on a table top with Orpheus, by Annibale Grifoni, 1660-1679, unknown materials, Villa medicea di Cerreto Guidi, Cerreto Guidi, Italy

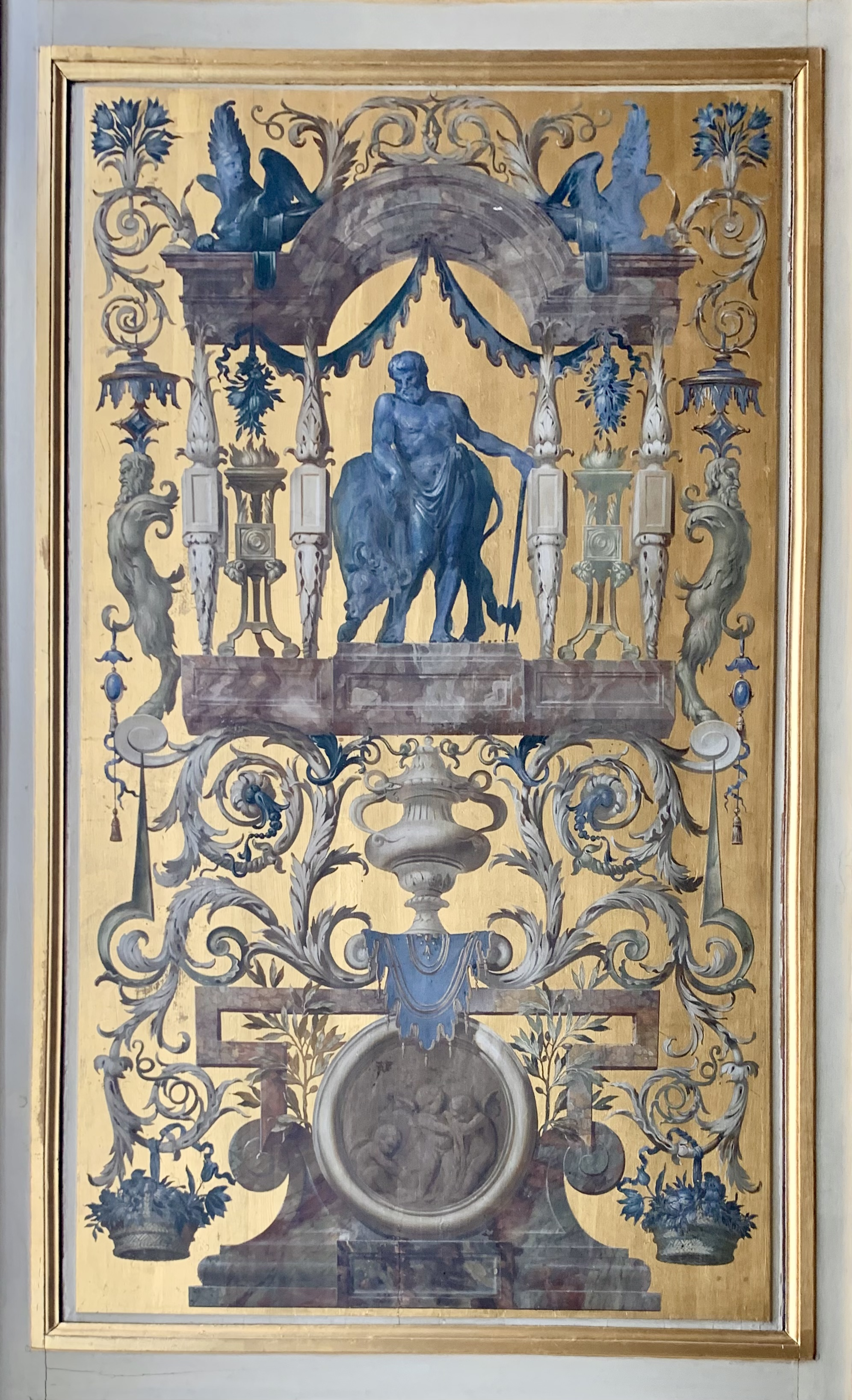
Baroque rinceaux on boiserie in the Galerie d'Apollon, Louvre Palace, by Louis Le Vau and Charles Le Brun, after 1661

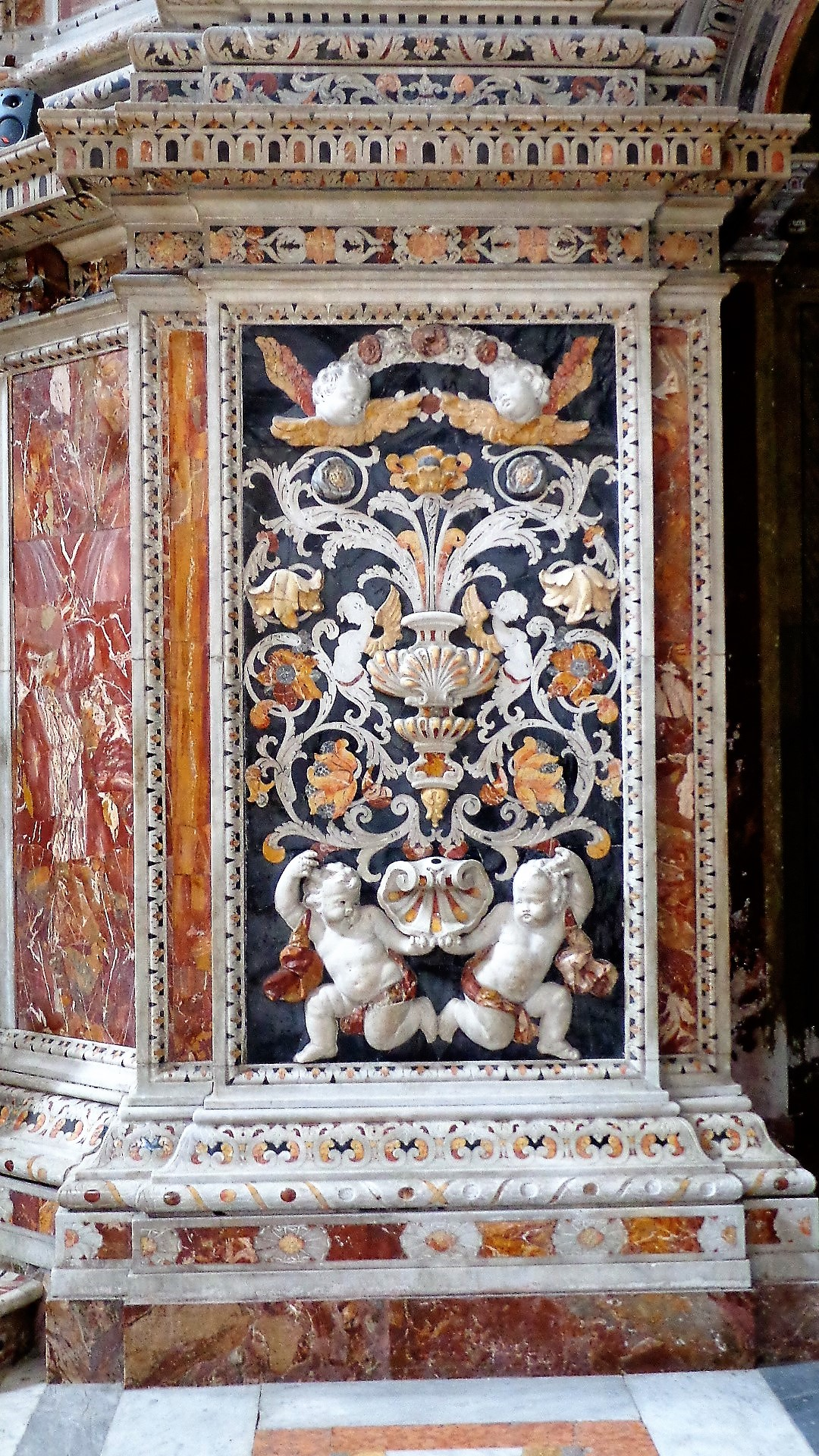
Baroque marble inlayed rinceaux in the Santa Caterina, Palermo, unknown architect of craftsman, 17th century

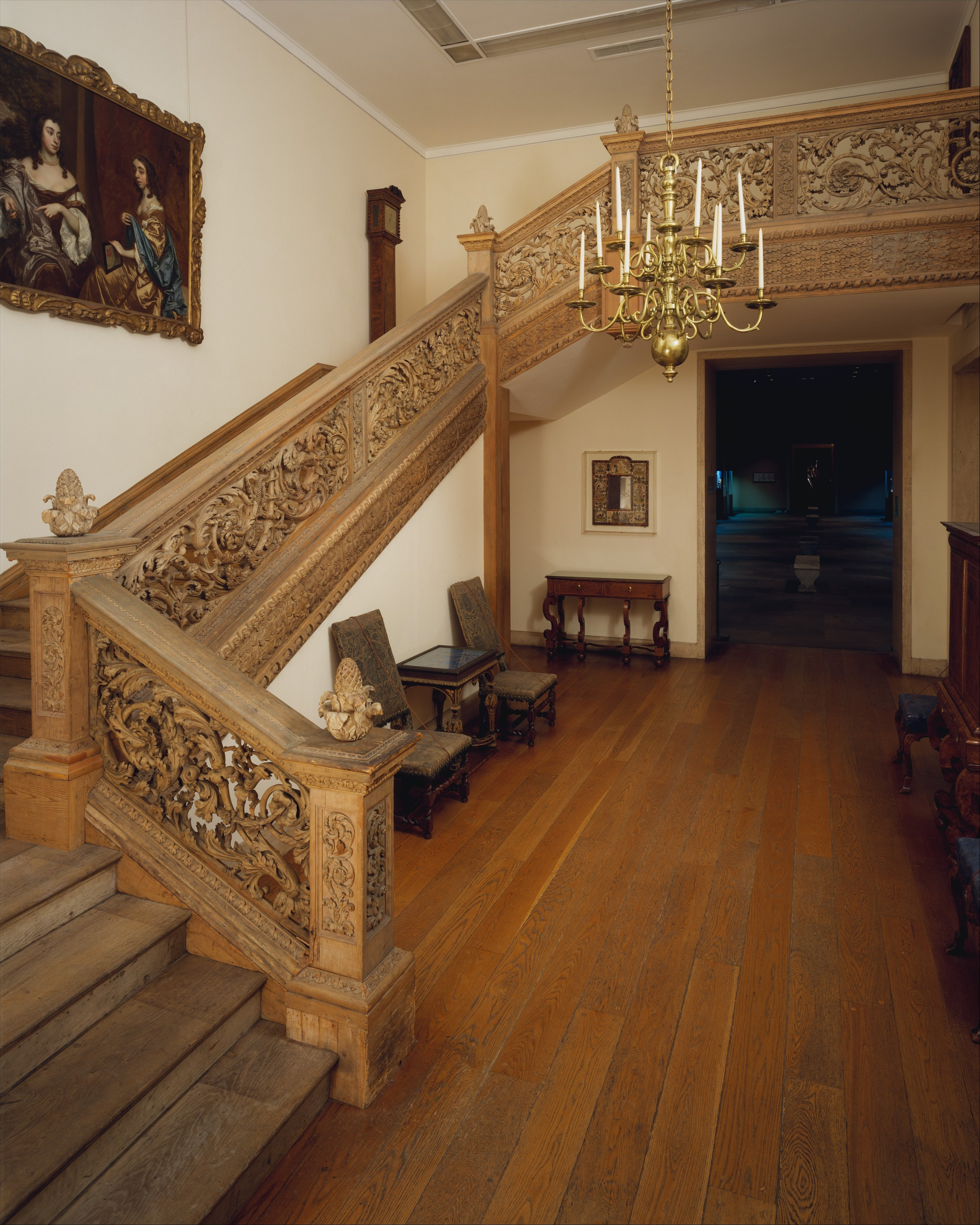
Baroque rinceaux on a staircase railing from the Cassiobury House, Hertfordshire, c.1677–1680, oak, elm and pine, Metropolitan Museum of Art, New York

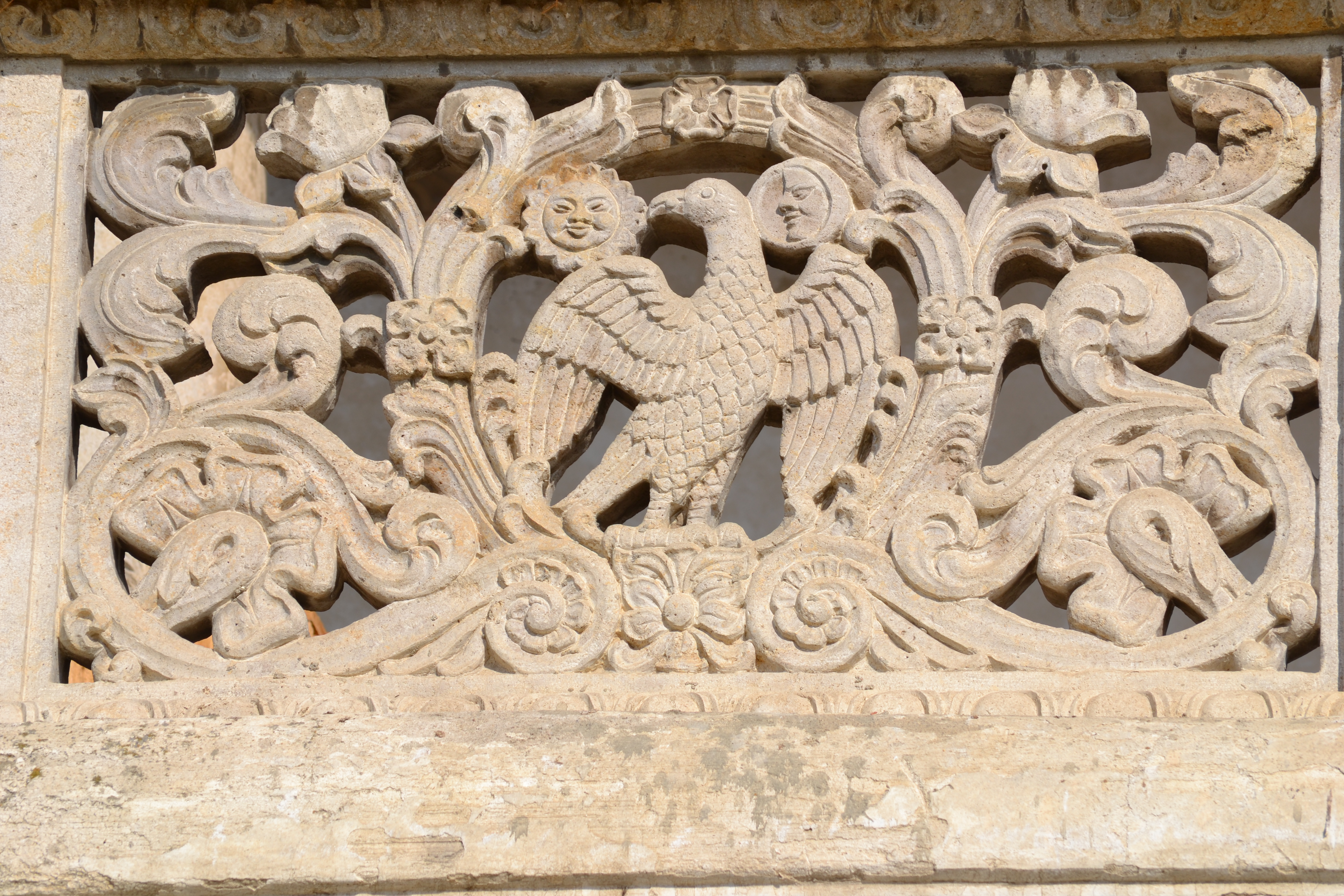
Brâncovenesc grape rinceau of a railing of the Potlogi Palace, Potlogi, Romania, unknown architect or sculptor, 1698

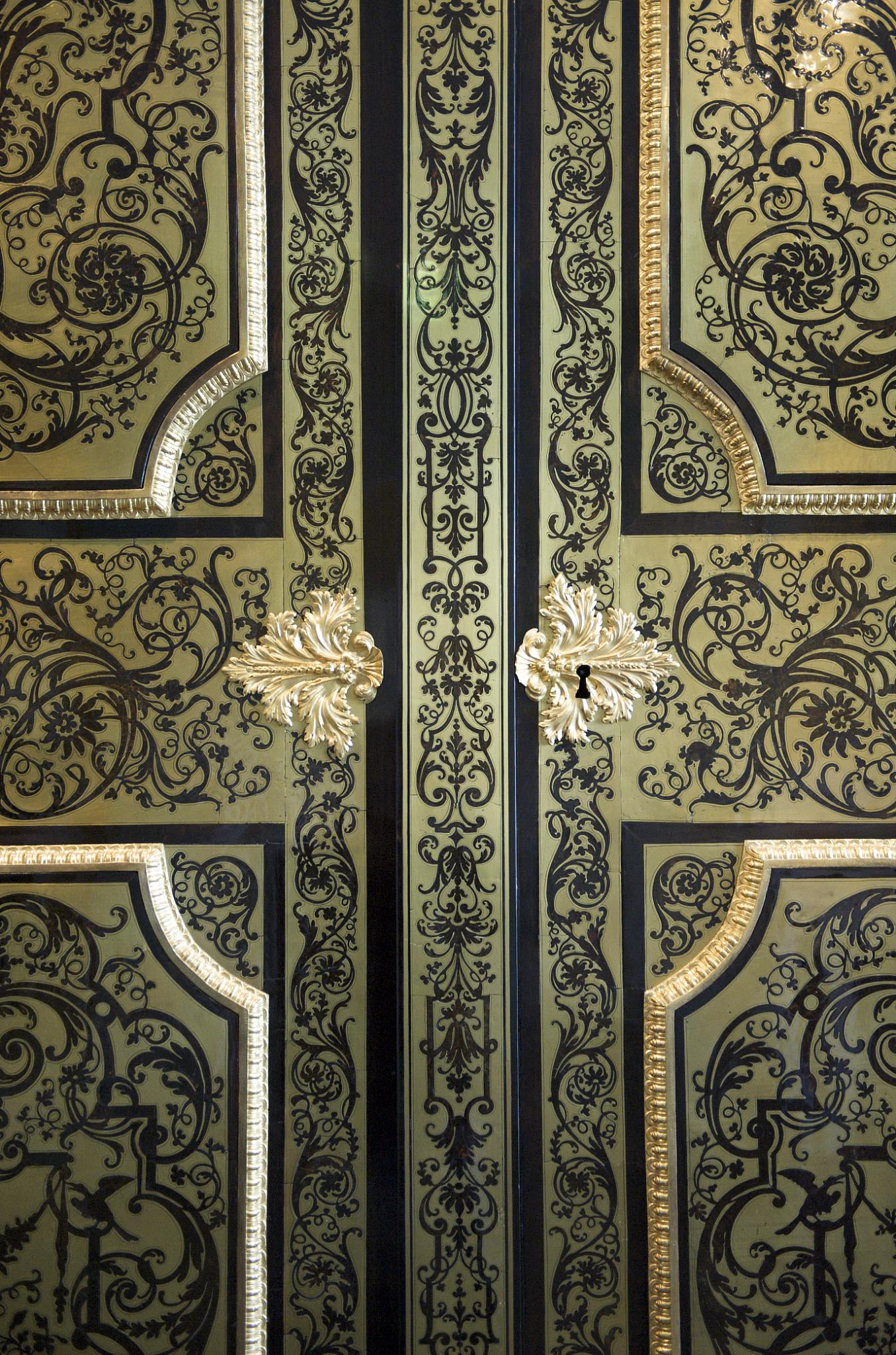
Baroque rinceaux on an armoire, attributed to Nicolas Sageot, c.1710, oak, marquetry of tortoiseshell on a brass background, Museum of Decorative Arts, Paris

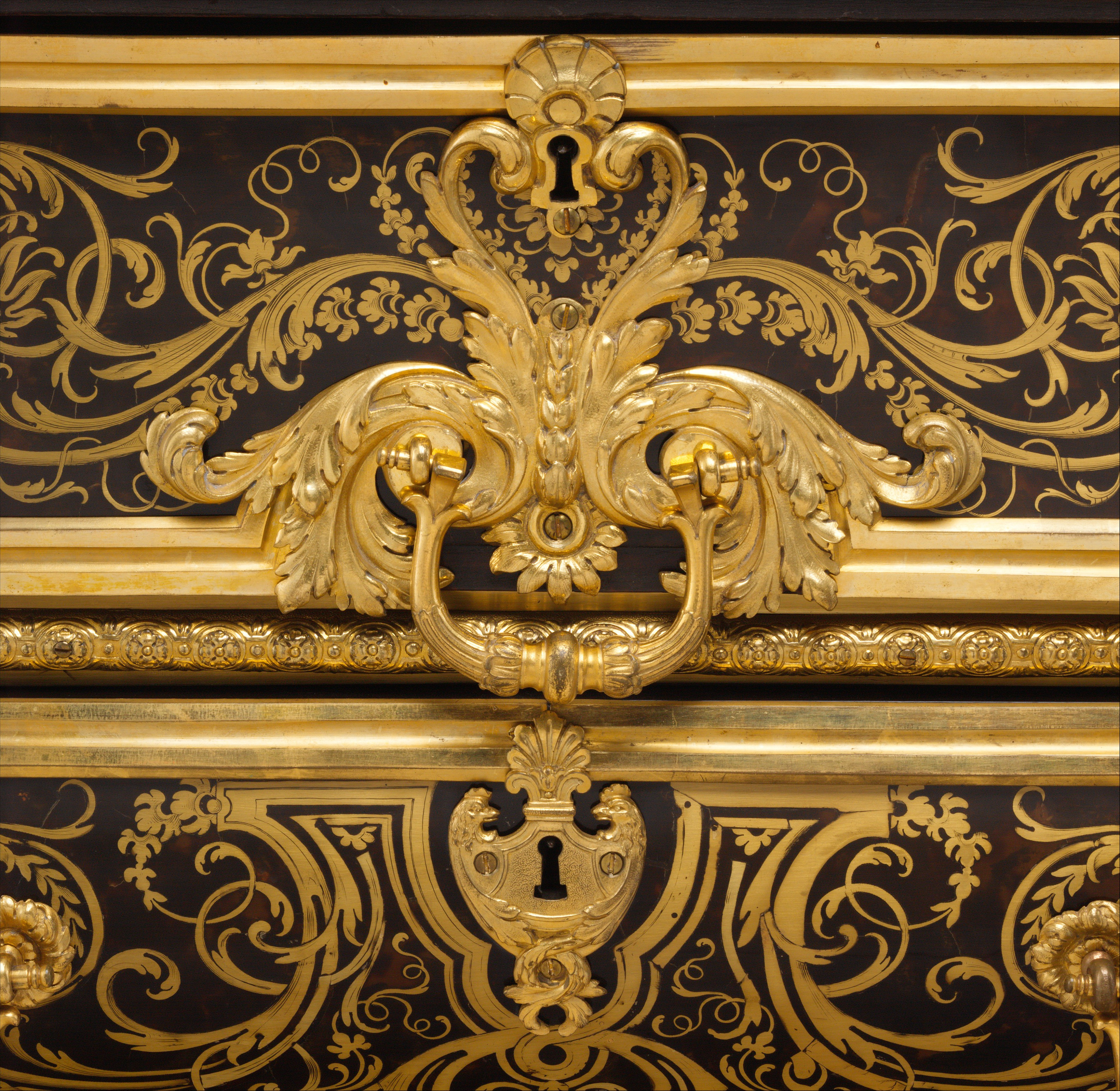
Baroque rinceaux on a commode, by André-Charles Boulle, c.1710–1720, walnut veneered with ebony, marquetry of engraved brass and tortoiseshell, and gilt-bronze mounts, Metropolitan Museum of Art, New York

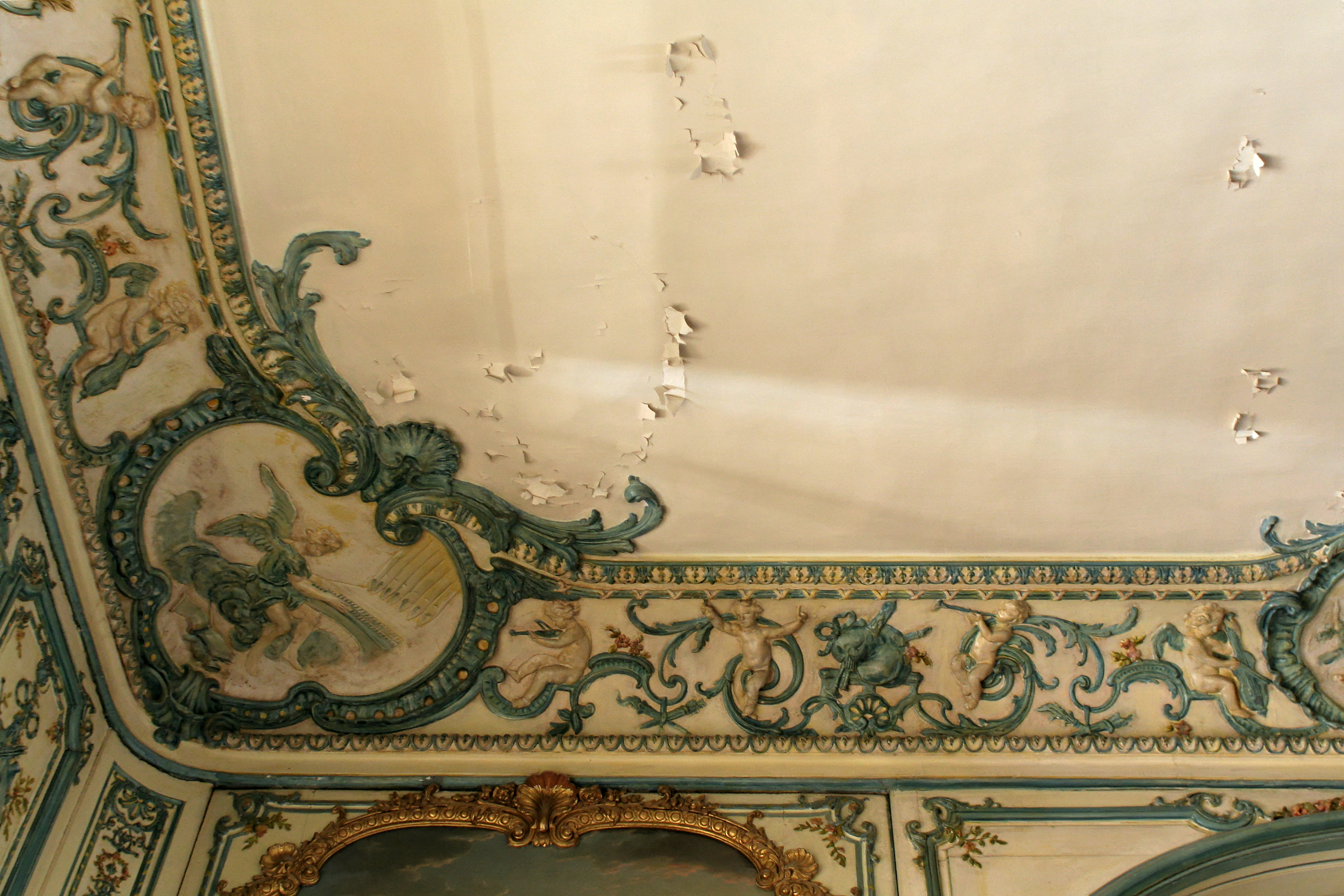
Rococo rinceaux in the Bibliothèque du Dauphin du Château de Versailles, Palace of Versailles, Versailles, France, unknown architect, early or mid-18th century

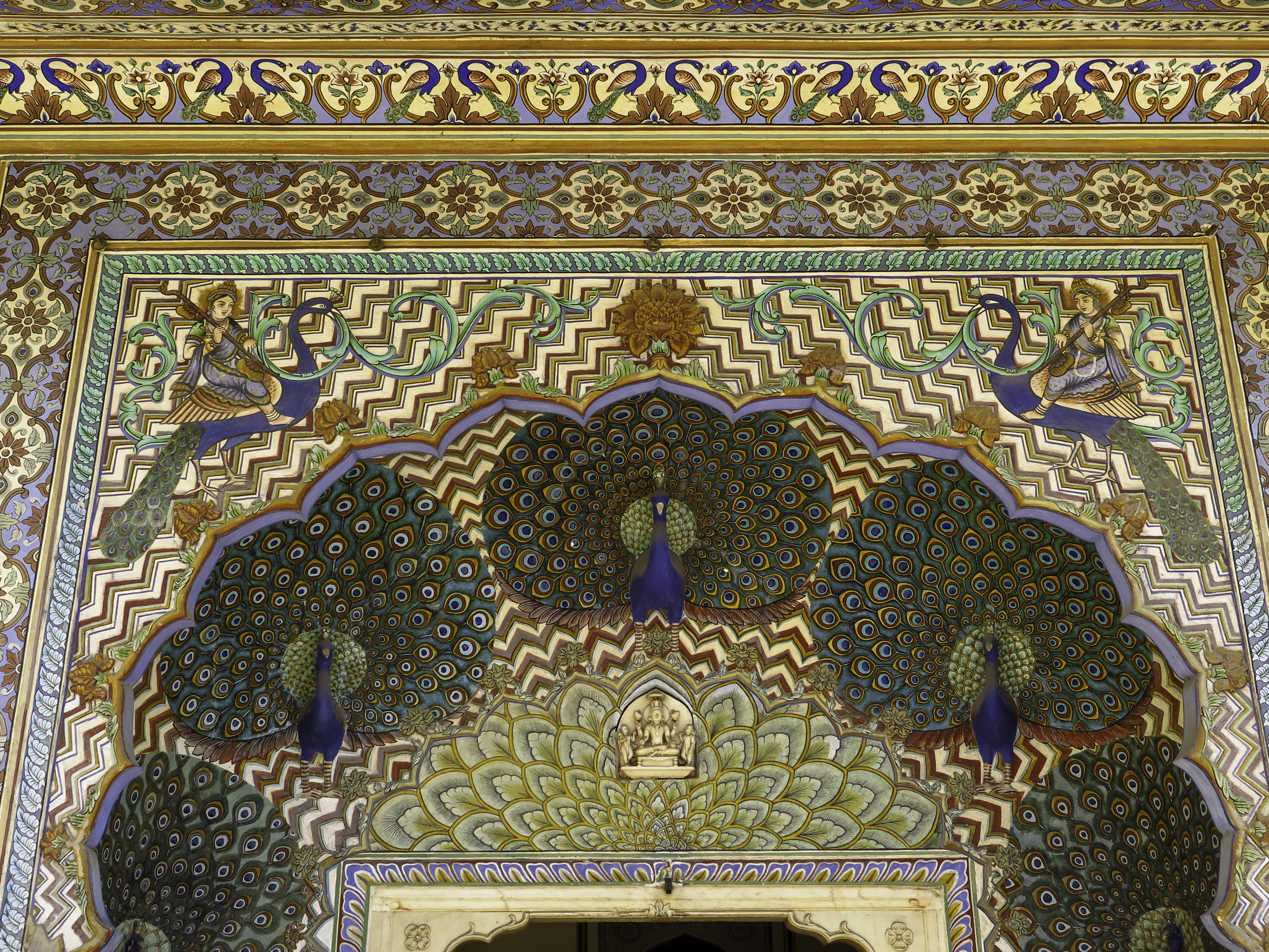
Mughal and European-influenced rinceaux of the Peacock Gate of the City Palace, Jaipur, India, unknown architect or painter, 1729-1732

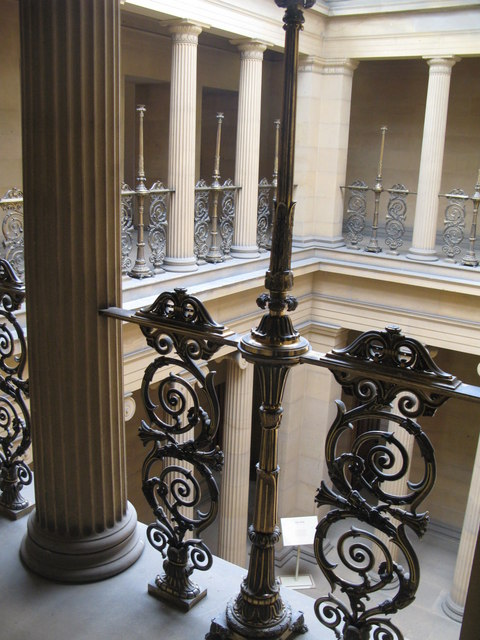
Neoclassical rinceaux railing in the Belsay Hall, Belsay, Northumberland, the UK, by Sir Charles Monck, 1810-1817

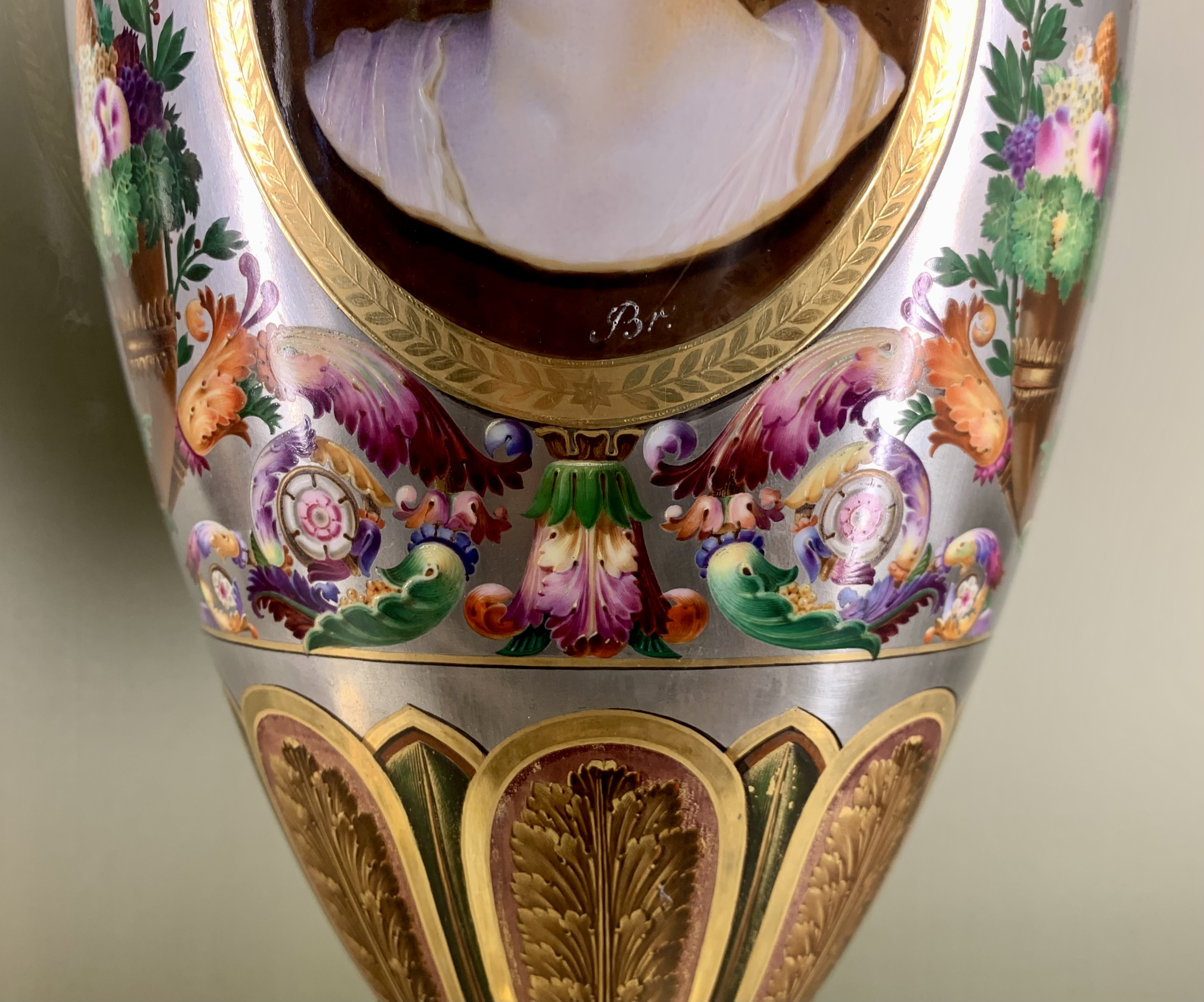
Neoclassical rinceaux on a vase, by the Sèvres Porcelain Manufactory, 1814, hard-paste porcelain with platinum background and gilt bronze mounts, Louvre

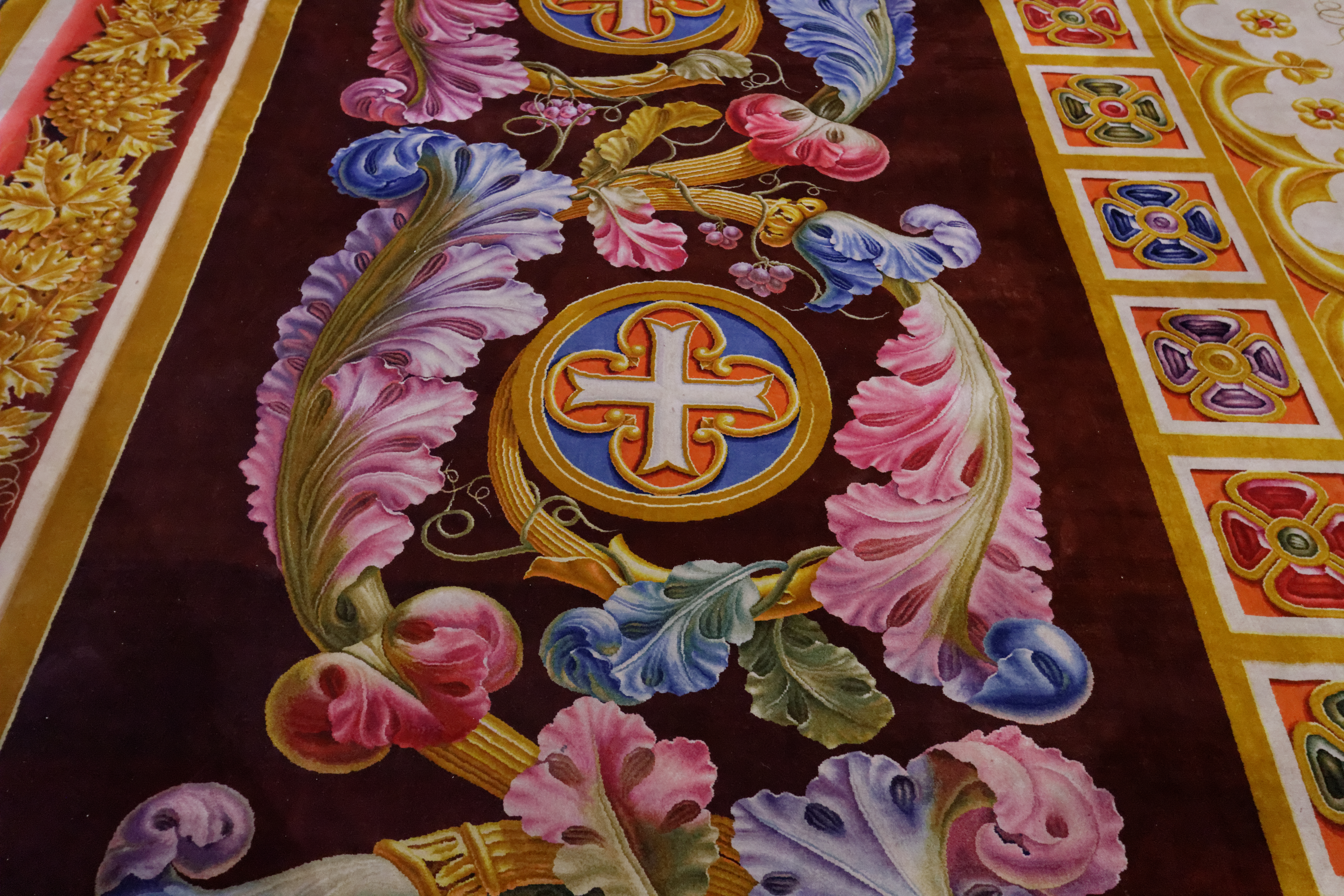
Gothic Revival rinceau on the choir carpet of Notre-Dame de Paris, by the Gobelins Manufactory, 1825-1833, textile, Notre-Dame de Paris

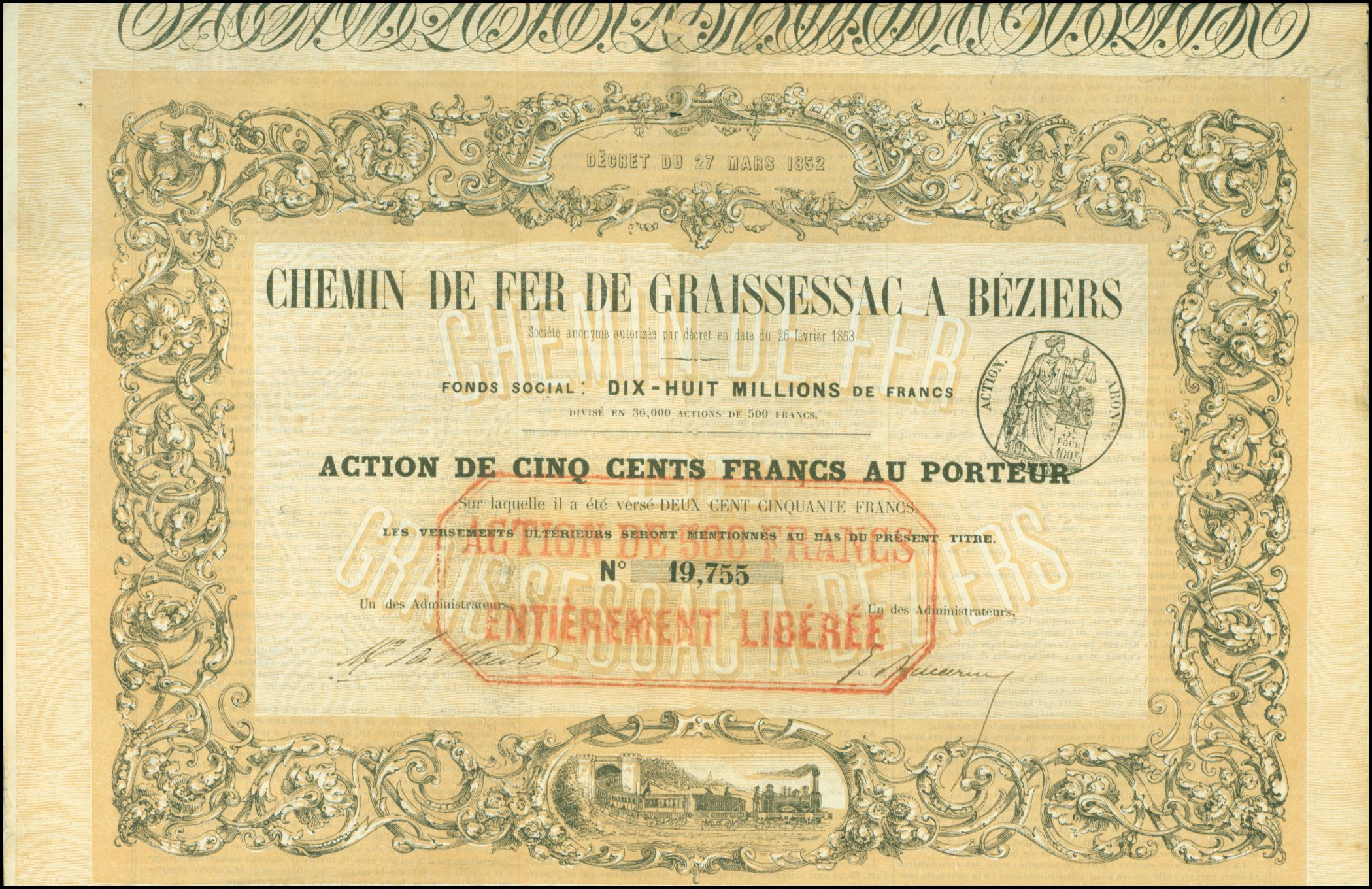
Neoclassical rinceaux on a stock certificate, unknown illustrator, 1852, ink on paper, unknown location

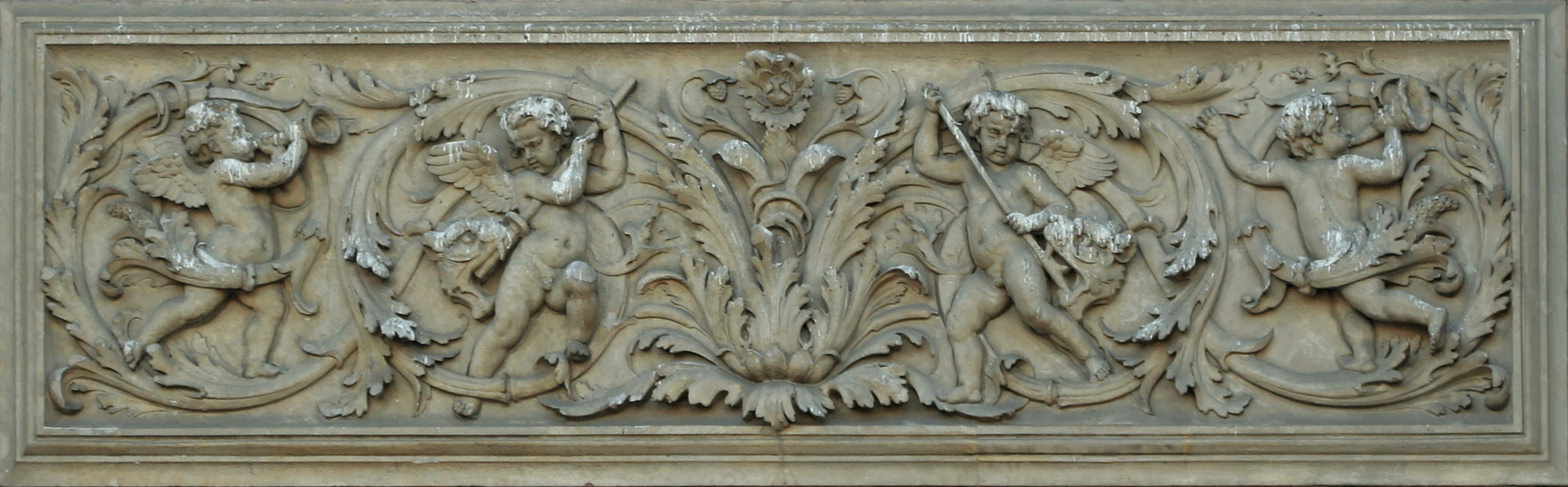
Renaissance Revival rinceaux with putti of the Fontaine Saint-Michel, Place Saint-Michel, Paris, designed by Gabriel Davioud, 1858-1860

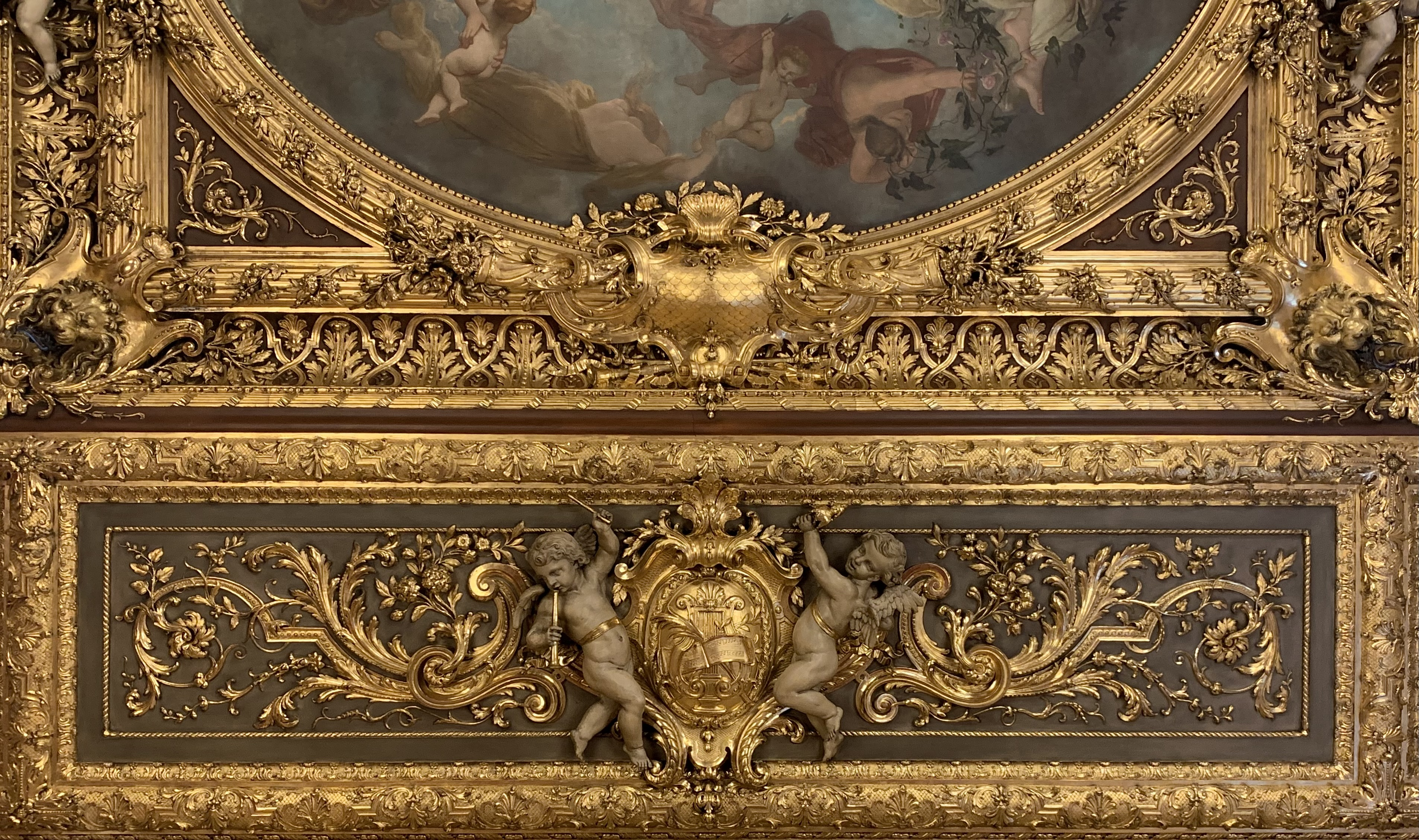
Baroque Revival rinceaux with putti on a ceiling in the apartments of the minister of state, currently known as the Napoleon III Apartments, Louvre Palace, unknown architect or sculptor, c.1860

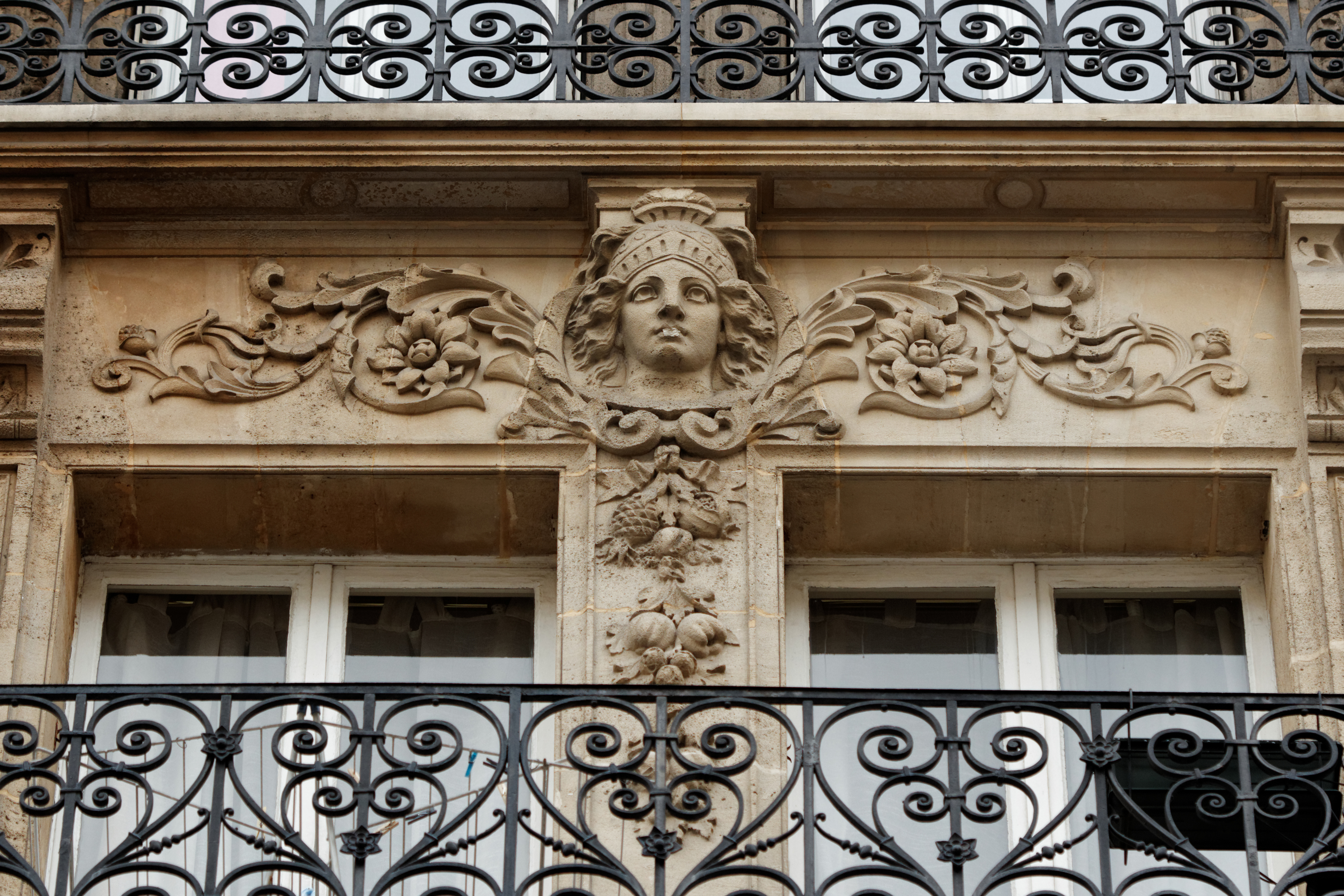
Neoclassical rinceaux with a mascaron of Rue des Vinaigriers no. 57, Paris, designed by E. Escudie, 1882

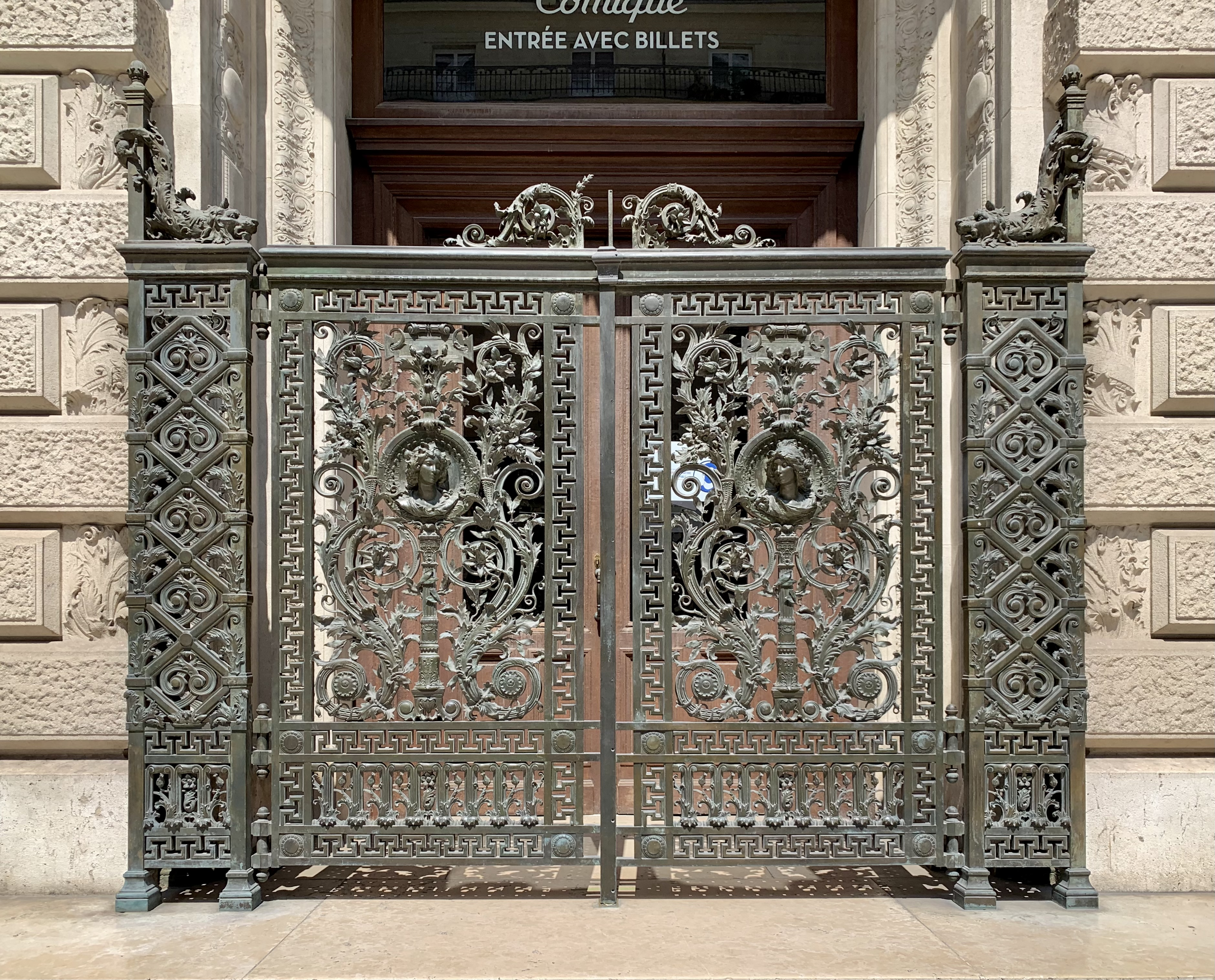
Neoclassical rinceaux on a grille at an entrance of the Salle Favart, Paris, probably designed by Louis Bernier, 1893-1898

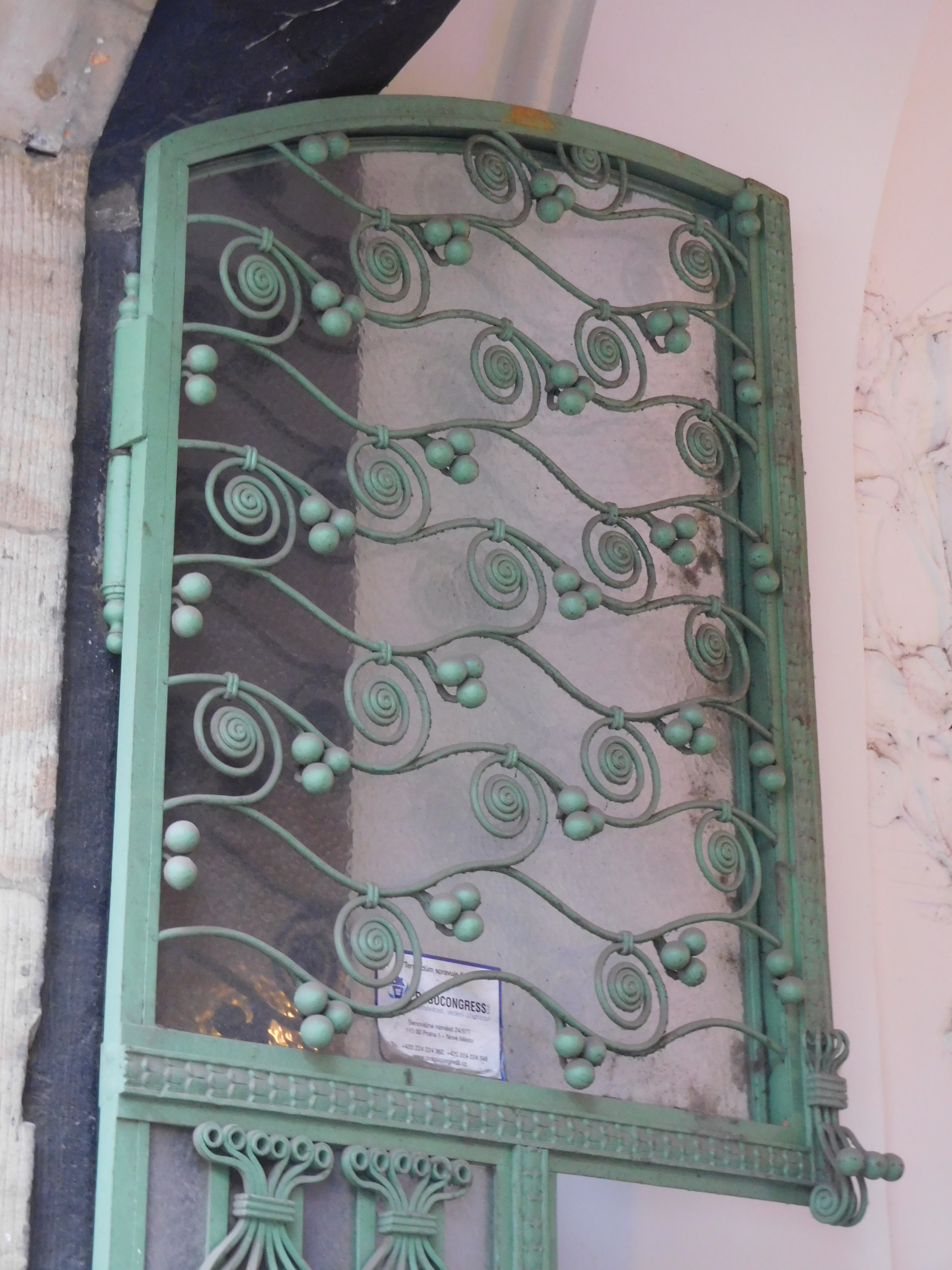
Highly stylized Vienna Secession rinceaux of Peterkův dům, Prague, Czech Republic, by Jan Kotěra and Vilém Tierhier, 1899

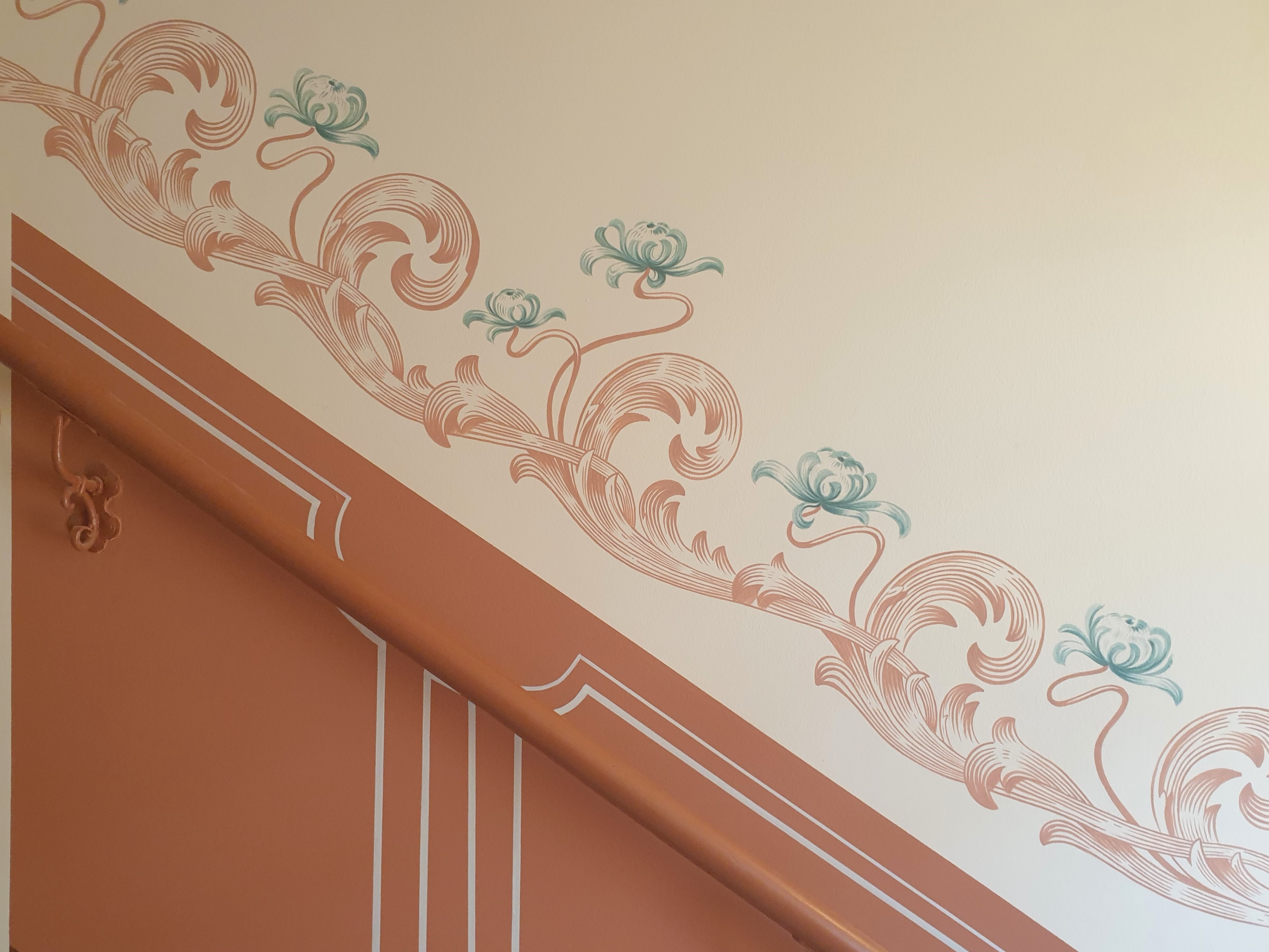
Art Nouveau painted rinceaux in the Brandversicherungsanstalt, Dresden, Germany, designed by Oswald Haenel, 1899-1901

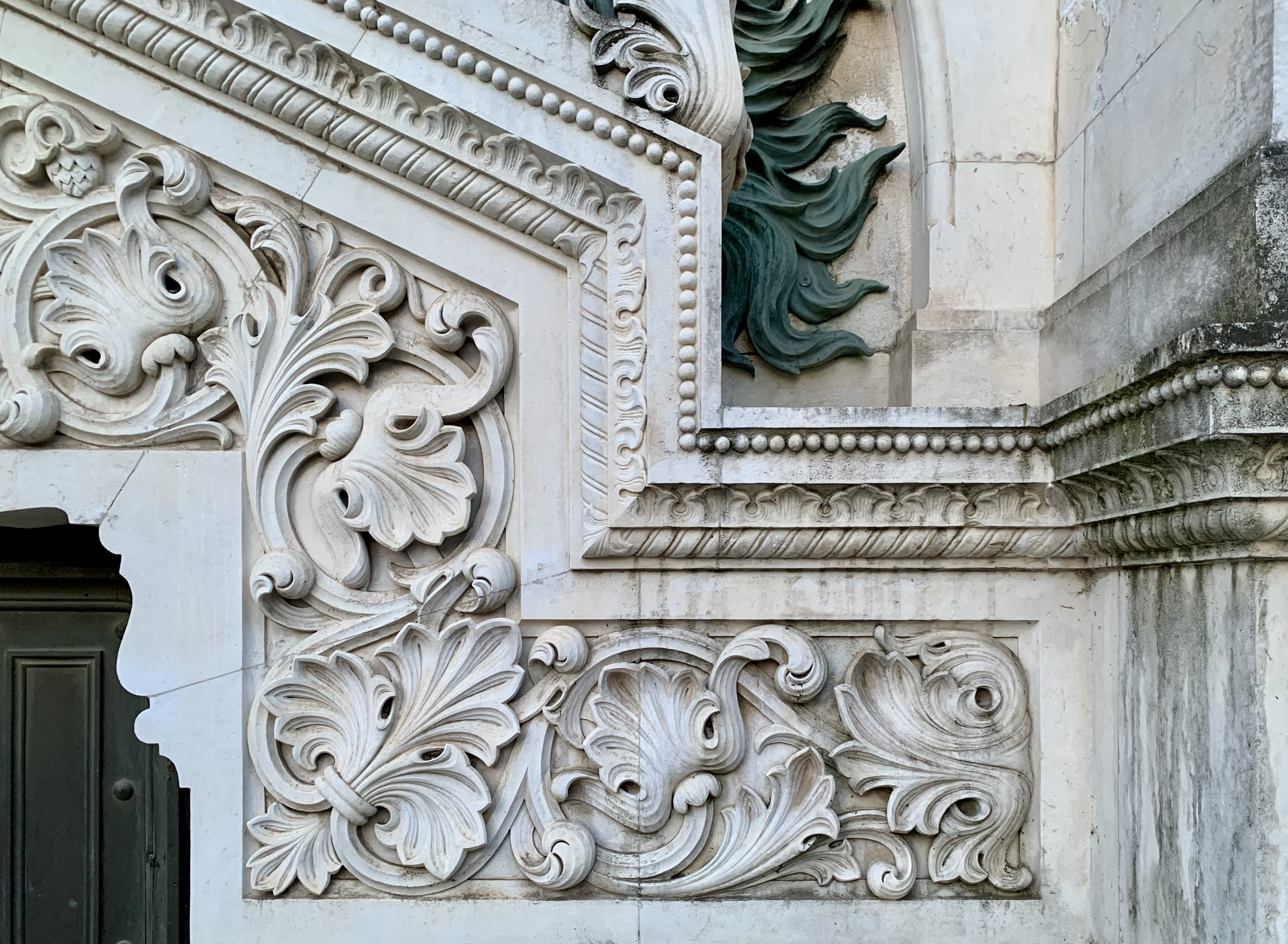
Romanian Revival rinceau on the Gheorghieff Brothers Tomb, Bellu Cemetery, Bucharest, Romania, by Ion Mincu, c.1900

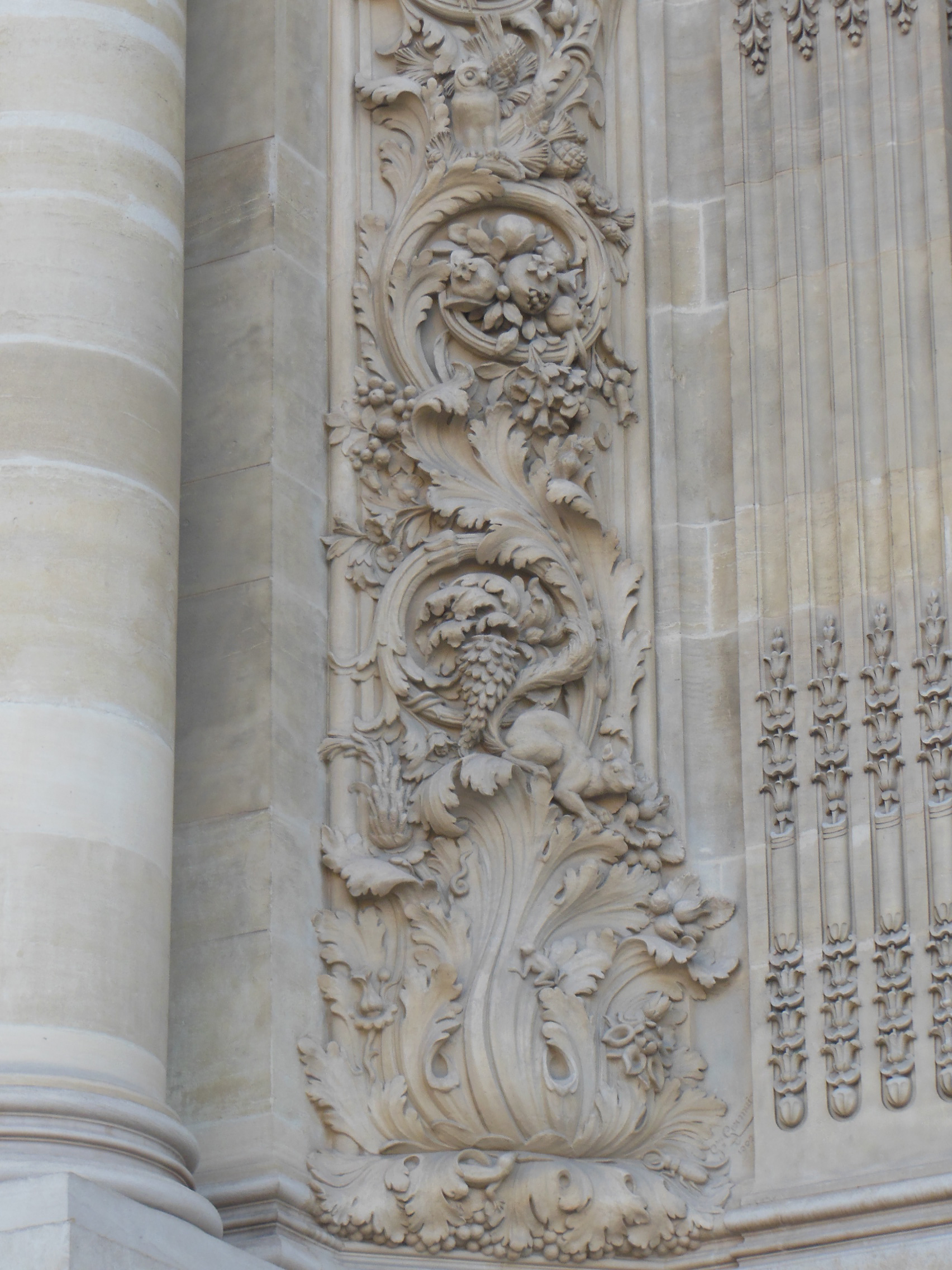
Beaux Arts rinceau on the Petit Palais, Paris, by Charles Giraud, 1900

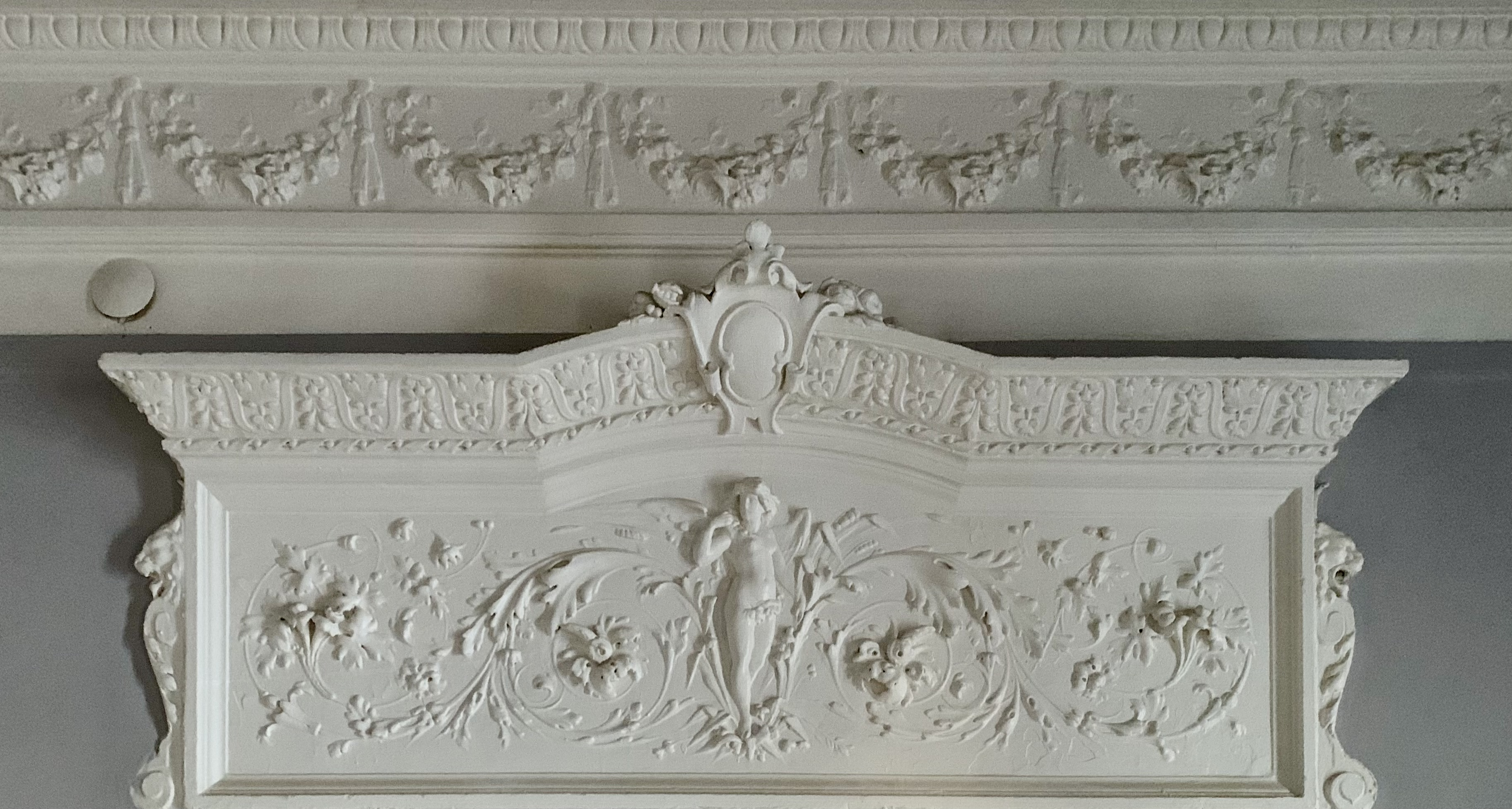
Beaux Arts over door with rinceaux in Strada Zborului no. 2, Bucharest, unknown architect or designer, c.1900

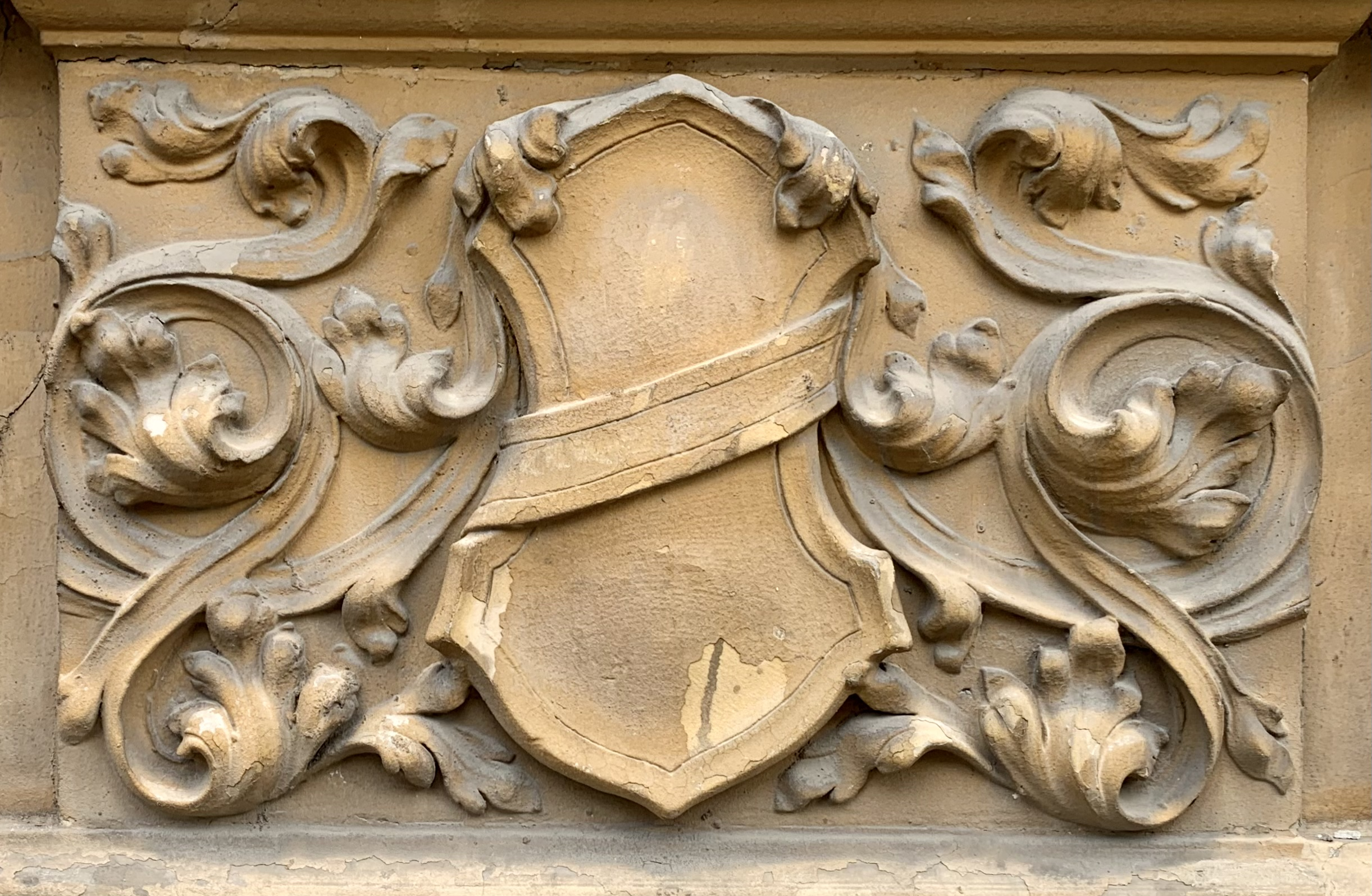
Gothic Revival rinceaux with cartouche of Strada Temișana no. 4, Bucharest, unknown architect, c.1900

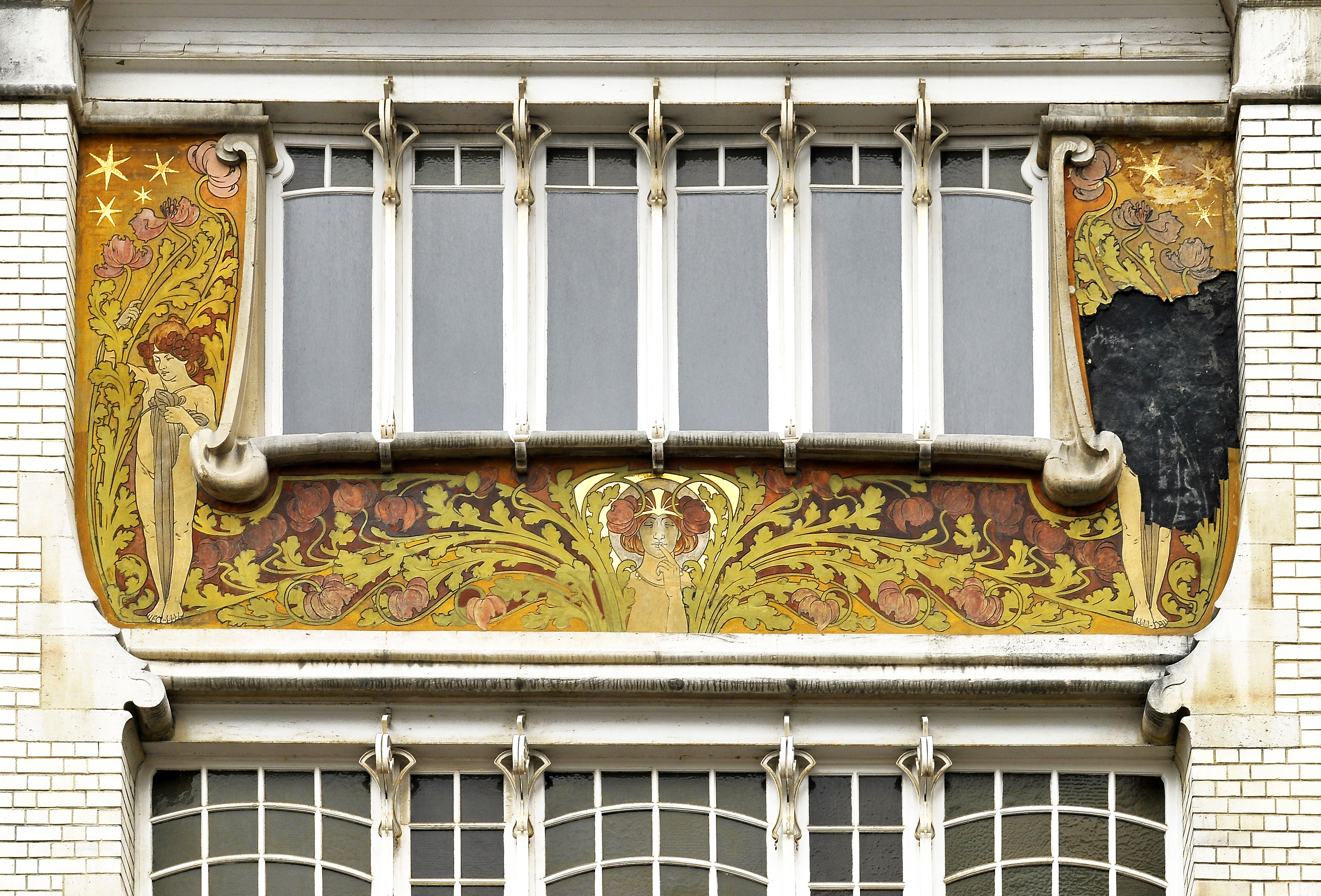
Art Nouveau sgraffito rinceaux on the Maison Beukman, Brussels, Belgium! by Albert Roosenboom, 1900

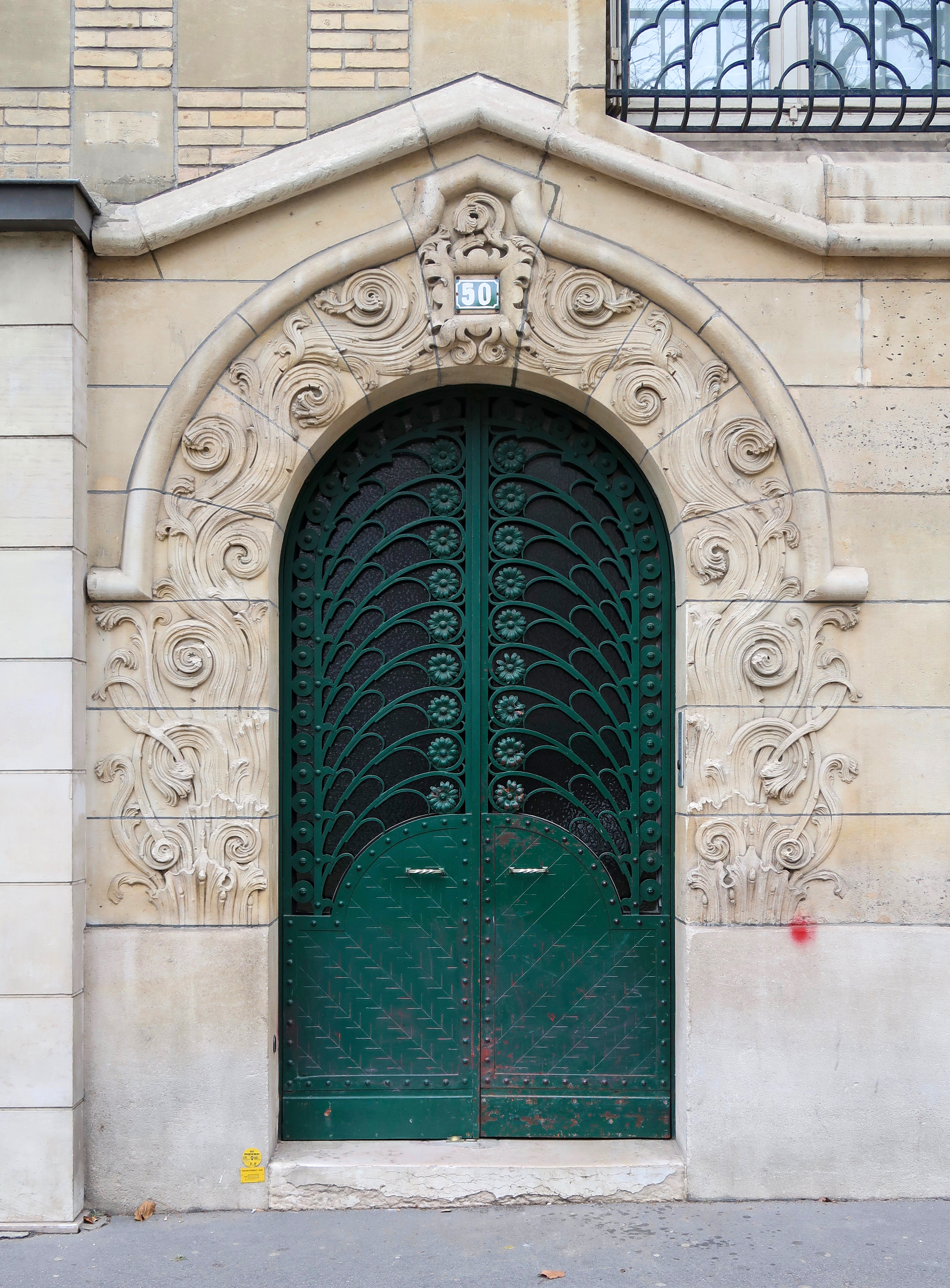
Art Nouveau rinceaux around the entrance door of Avenue de Ségur no. 50, Paris, by Gabriel Ruprich-Robert, 1900

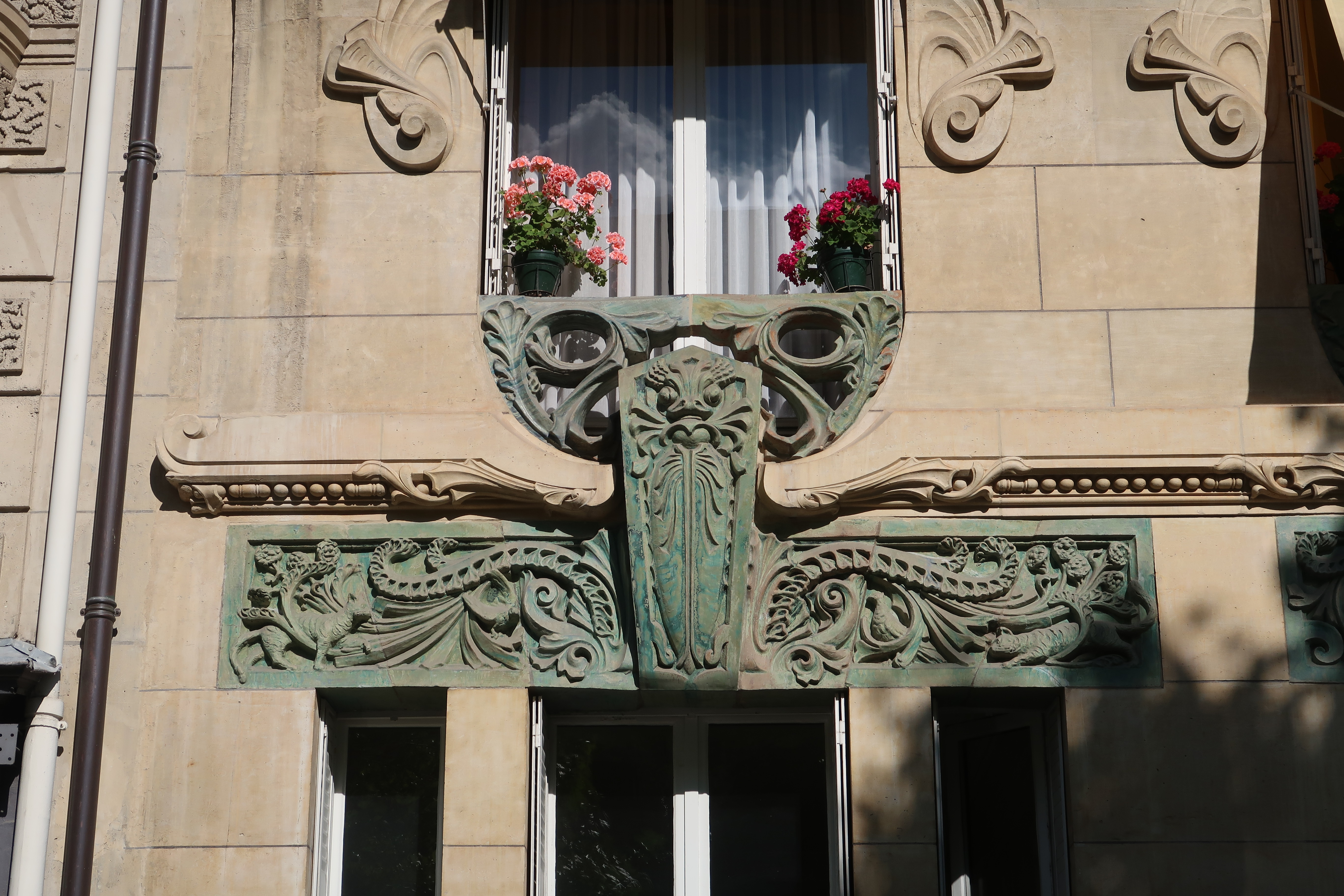
Art Nouveau rinceaux on the Lavirotte Building (Avenue Rapp no. 29), Paris, designed by Jules Lavirotte and decorated with sculpture and ceramic tiles made by Alexandre Bigot, 1901

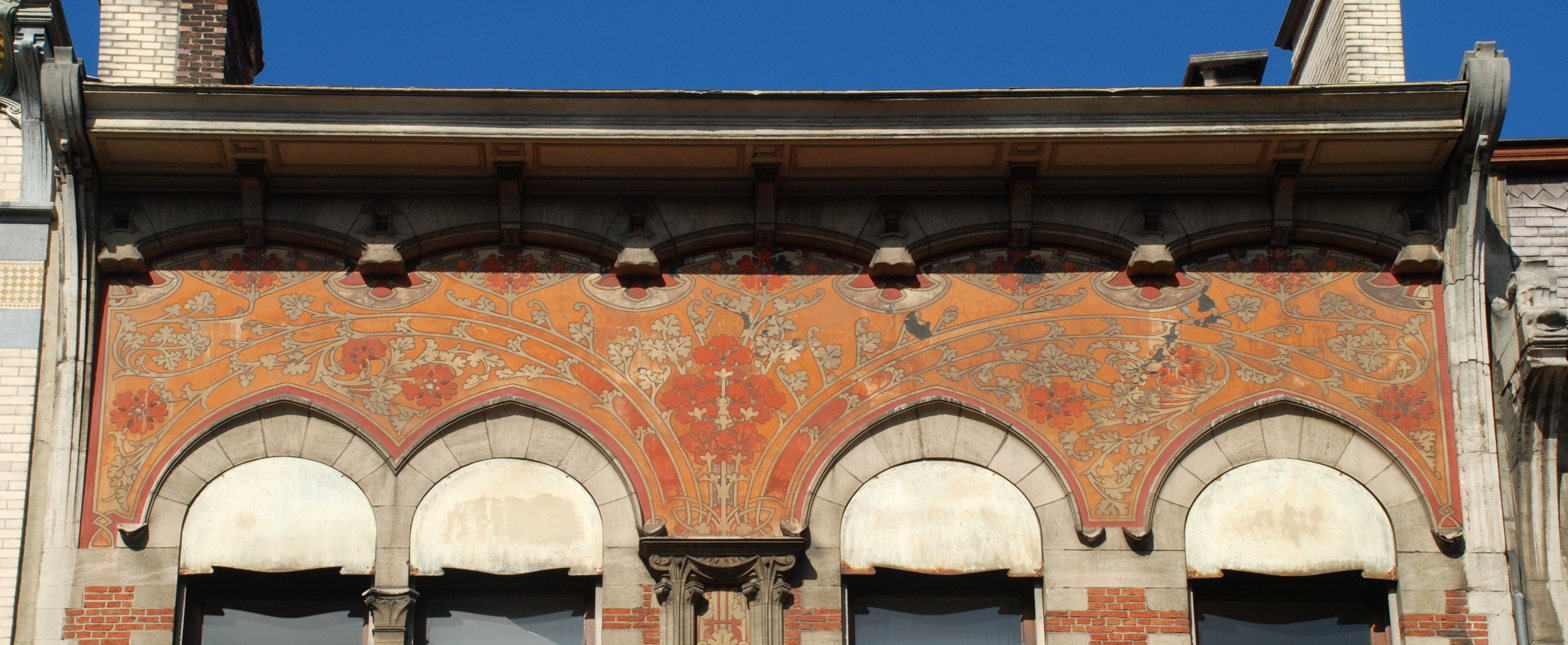
Art Nouveau sgraffito rinceaux on the Maison Henri Jacobs (Avenue Maréchal Foch no. 9), Brussels, architect Henri Jacobs, sgraffito by Privat Livemont, 1903

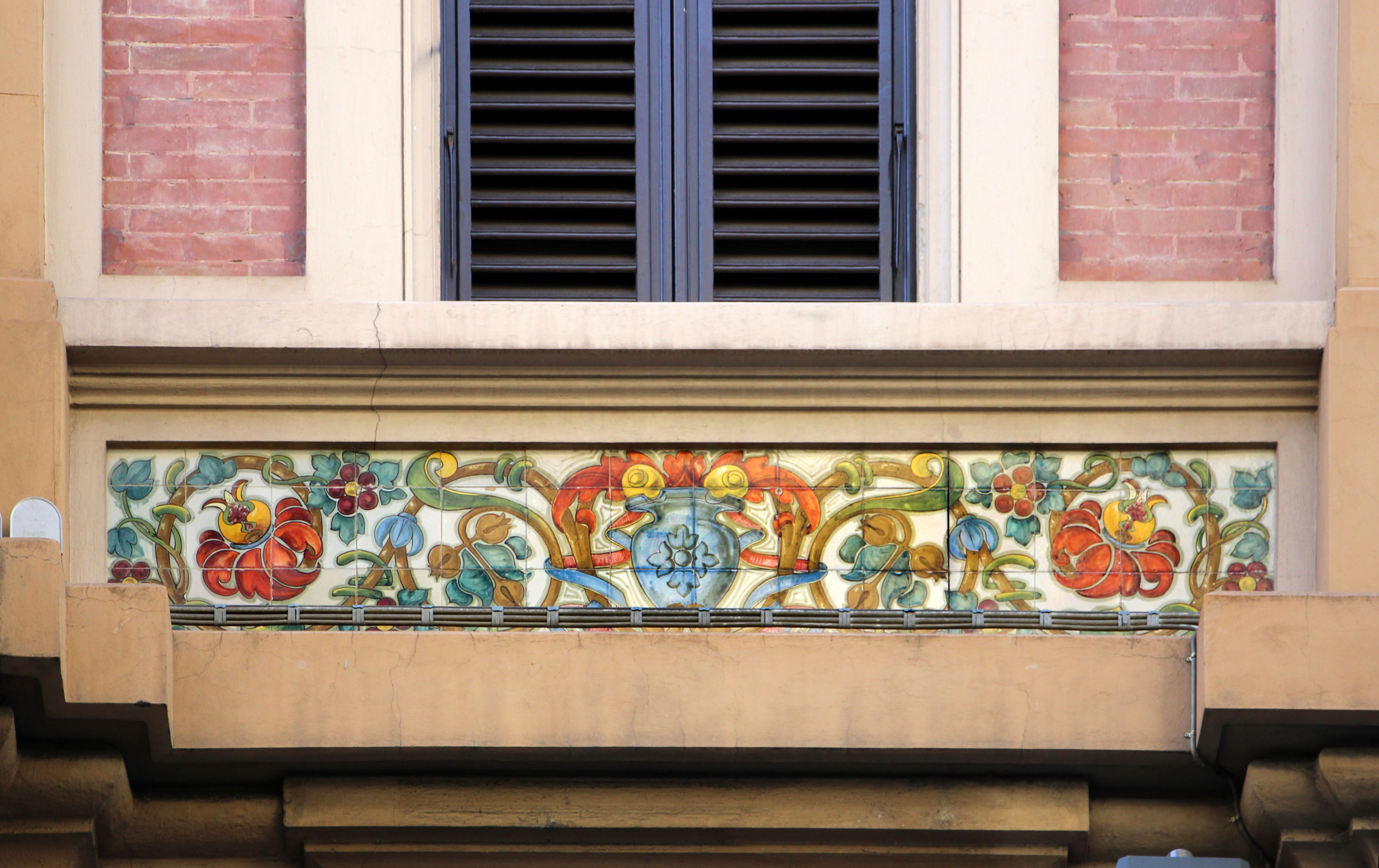
Rinceaux on tiles on the Palazzo Pola e Todescan (Via del Campidoglio no. 3), Florence, Italy, by Giovanni Paciarelli, 1903

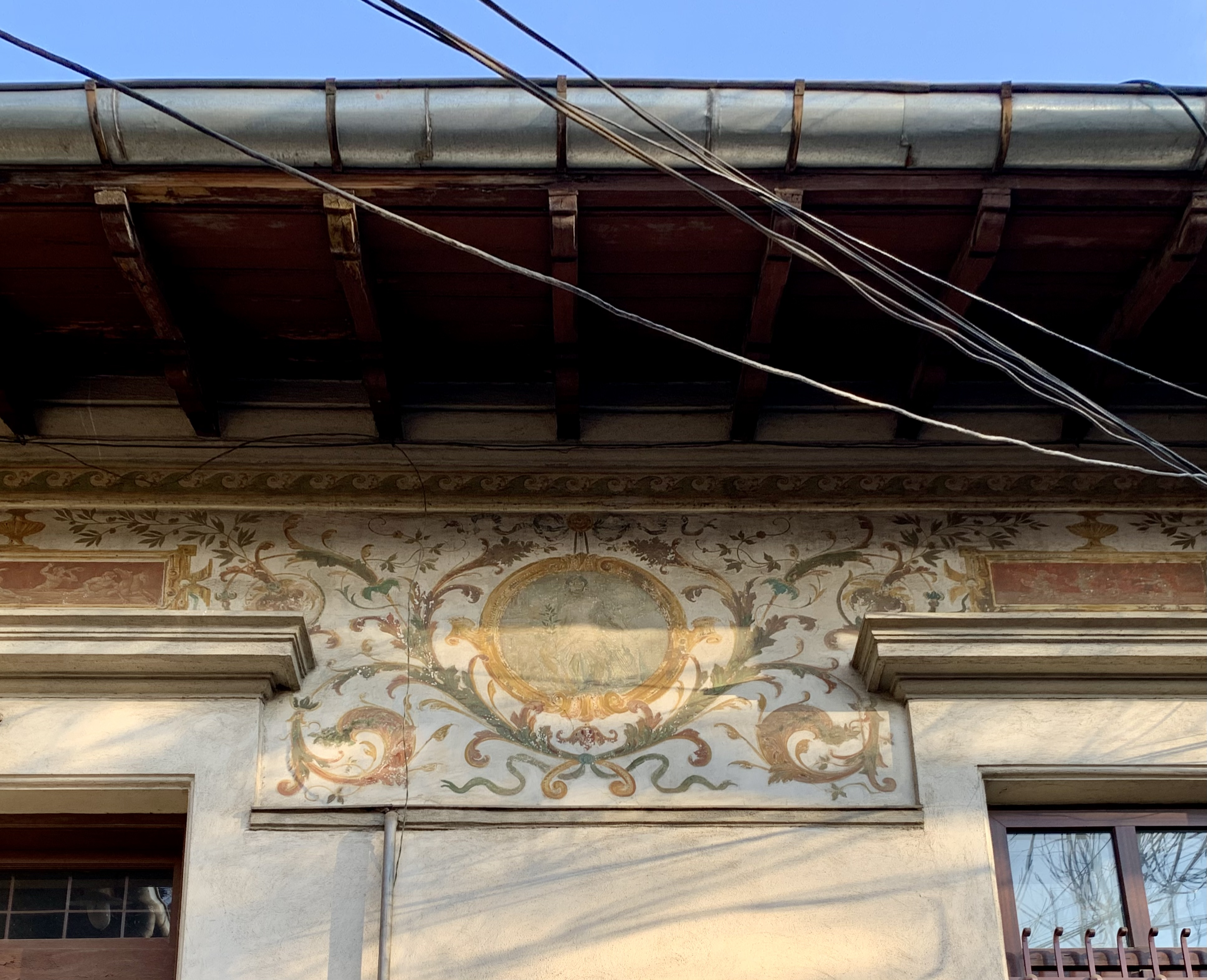
Renaissance Revival fresco with cartouches and foliage spirals on the upper part of the facade of Strada Occidentului no. 11, Bucharest, painter: C. Cora, architect: Cesare Fantoli, 1910

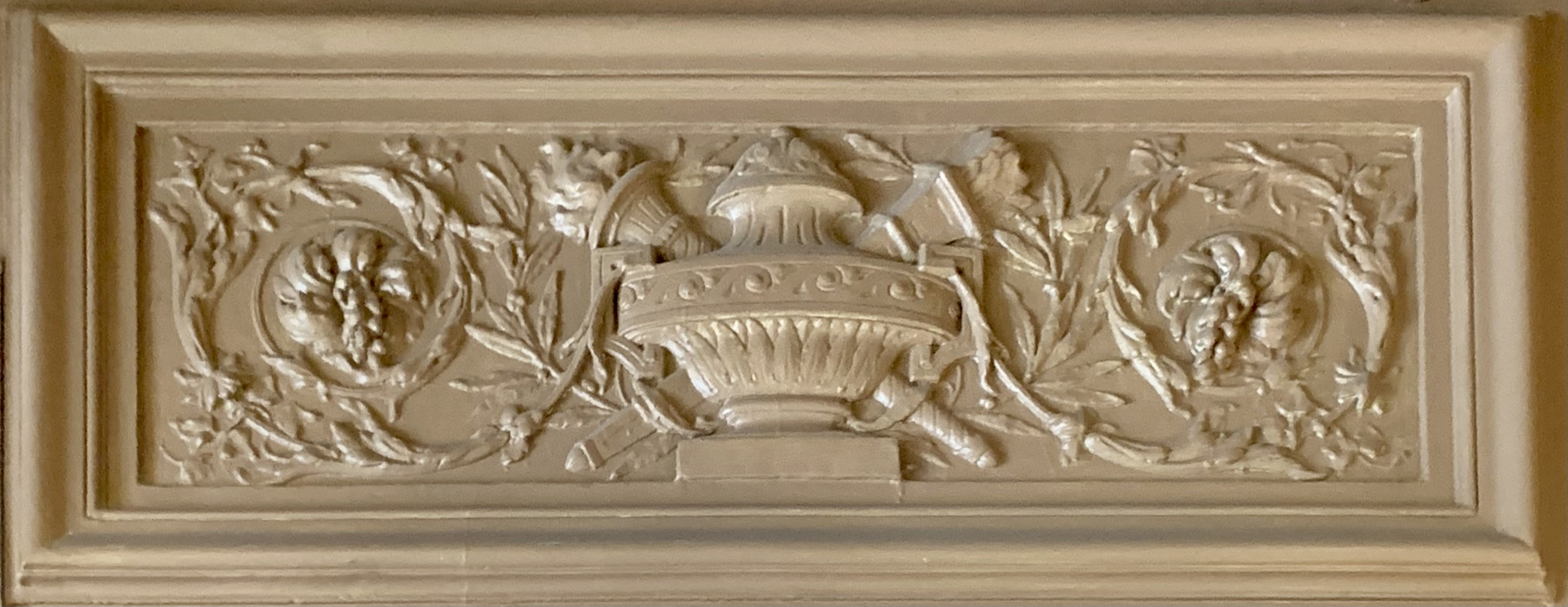
Neo-Louis XVI style panel with rinceaux and an urn in the Nicolae T. Filitti/Nae Filitis House (Calea Dorobanților no. 18), Bucharest, by Ernest Doneaud, c.1910

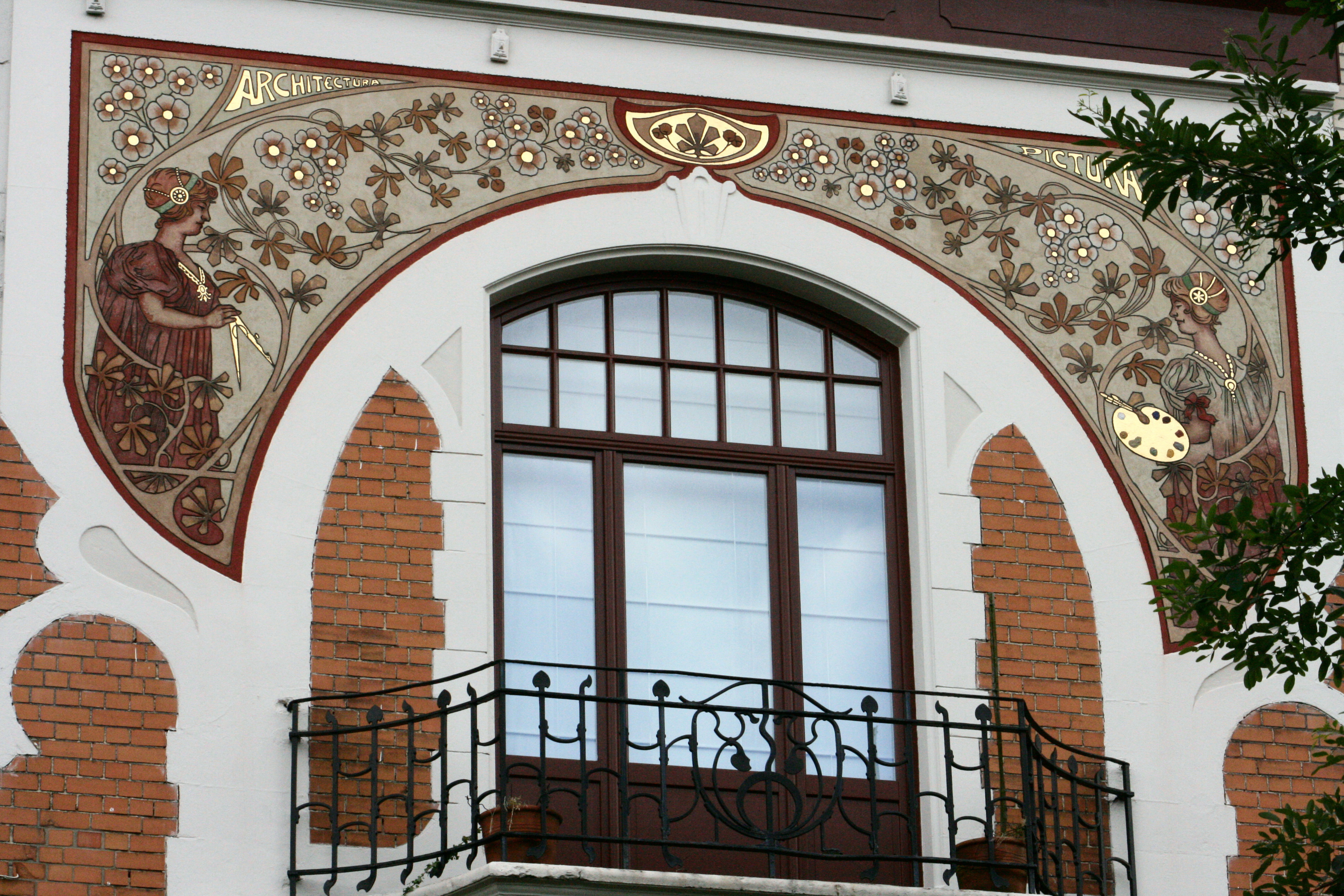
Art Nouveau sgraffito rinceaux on Avenue Richard Neybergh no. 160, Brussels, architect Eugène Leman, non attributed sgraffito, 1910

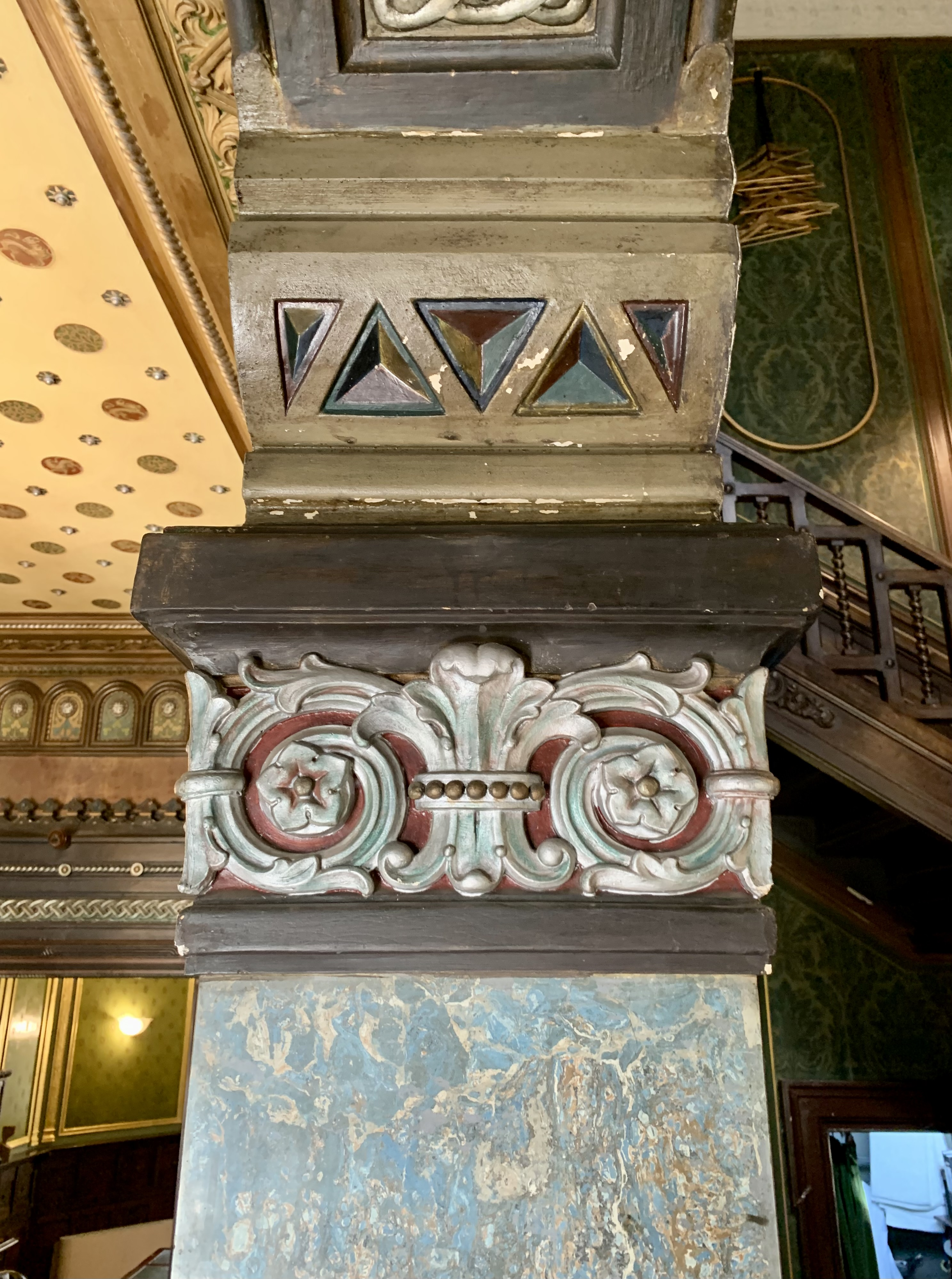
Romanian Revival rinceau in the Gheorghe Petrașcu House (Piața Romană no. 5), Bucharest, by Spiru Cegăneanu, 1912

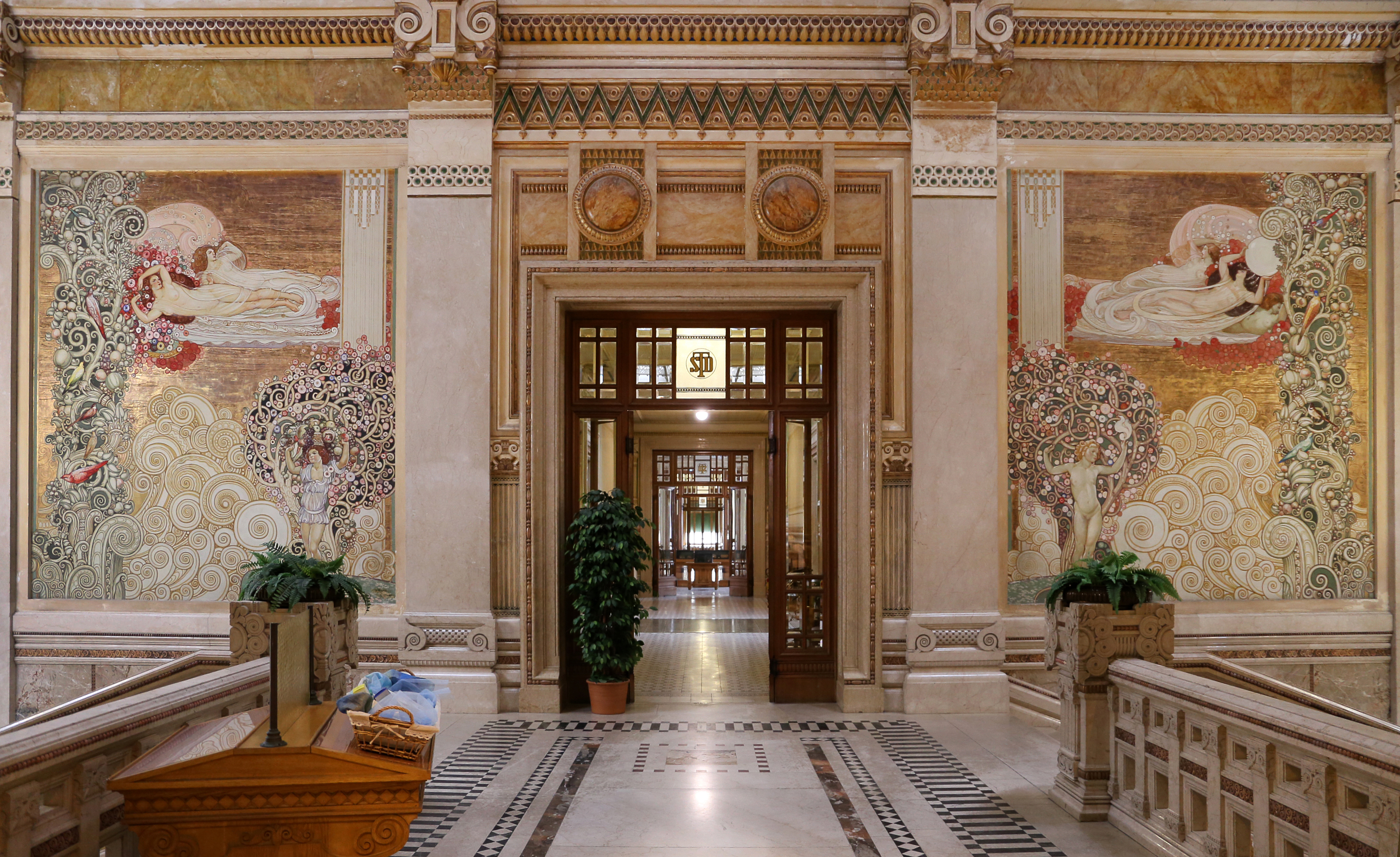
Art Nouveau rinceaux in two murals from the Palazzo delle Terme Berzieri, Salsomaggiore Terme, Italy, unknown artist, 1922

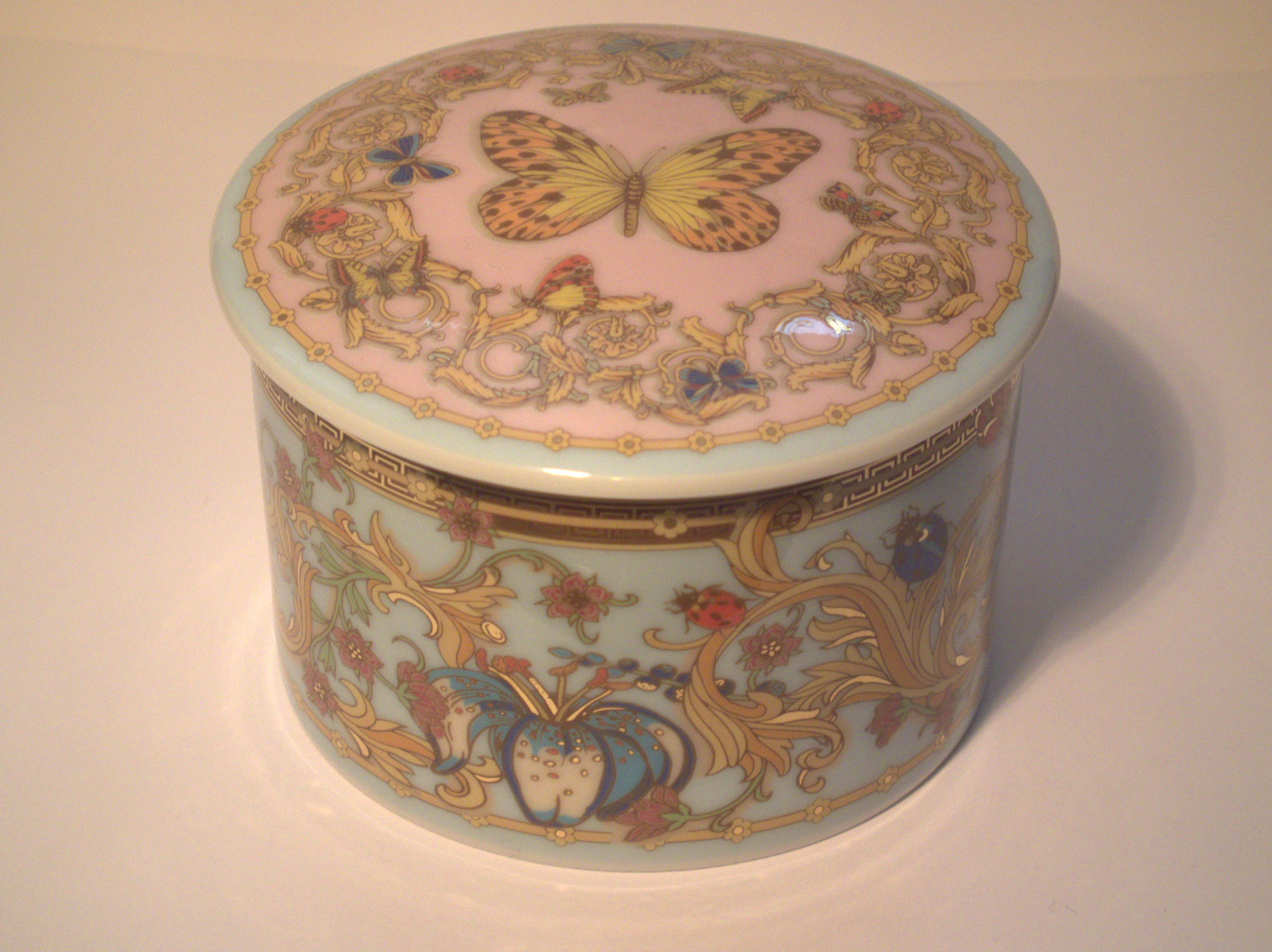
Postmodern rinceaux on a box, part of the Le Jardin de Versace collection, designed by Versace and produced by Rosenthal; c.2015, porcelain, unknown location

== See also ==
- Margent
- Scroll
- Scrollwork
- Volute
- Acanthus (ornament)
