= Renaissance illumination =

Production of illuminated manuscripts influenced Renaissance painting

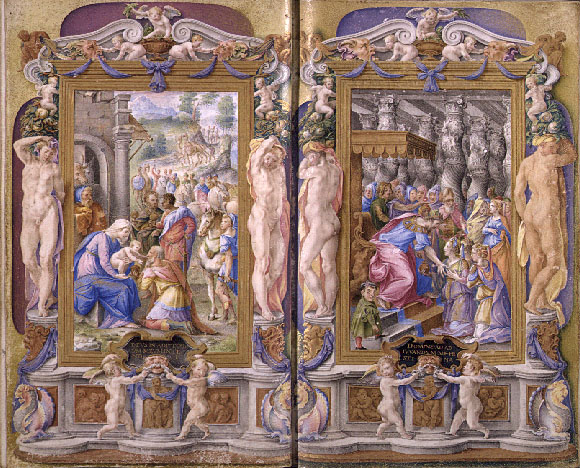
Giulio Clovio, Adoration of the Magi. Double page from the Book of Hours of Cardinal Farnese, 1537–1546, Pierpont Morgan Library, M.69 (fols. 38v-39).

Renaissance illumination refers to the production of illuminated manuscripts in Western Europe in the late 15th and 16th centuries, influenced by the representational techniques and motifs of Renaissance painting. With the invention of printing, book painting did not disappear abruptly, but continued in certain luxury manuscripts, and even in some printed works. Illuminators of the period used techniques of perspective representation and iconographic themes specific to the period. Restricted to luxury works, this type of production declined in the second half of the 16th century, as engraving became increasingly competitive.

== Characteristics ==
=== New scripts and decorations ===
At the beginning of the 15th century, humanist scholars developed a new script. It was inspired by Romanesque manuscripts of the 11th and 12th centuries, which in turn were inspired by Carolingian texts of the 9th century. The first manuscript written in this script is probably one of the works of Catullus from Poggio Bracciolini in Florence about 1400–1402 (Biblioteca Marciana, Lat.XII, 80).

At the same time, new initial decorations were created, also inspired by the Carolingian manuscripts, and known as the bianchi girari (white vines in English). Composed of white scrolls decorated with flattened knots, trilobes, and palmettes, they are usually set against a red, blue, yellow, or green background.

The same manuscript by Poggio Bracciolini was the first to use this type of script. These designs were later used to decorate the borders of the pages, with putti, portraits, animals, and other increasingly naturalistic plants.

This type of decoration is characteristic of Italian Renaissance illumination of the 15th century that eventually disappeared from Italy by the end of the century.

=== Sources of inspiration ===
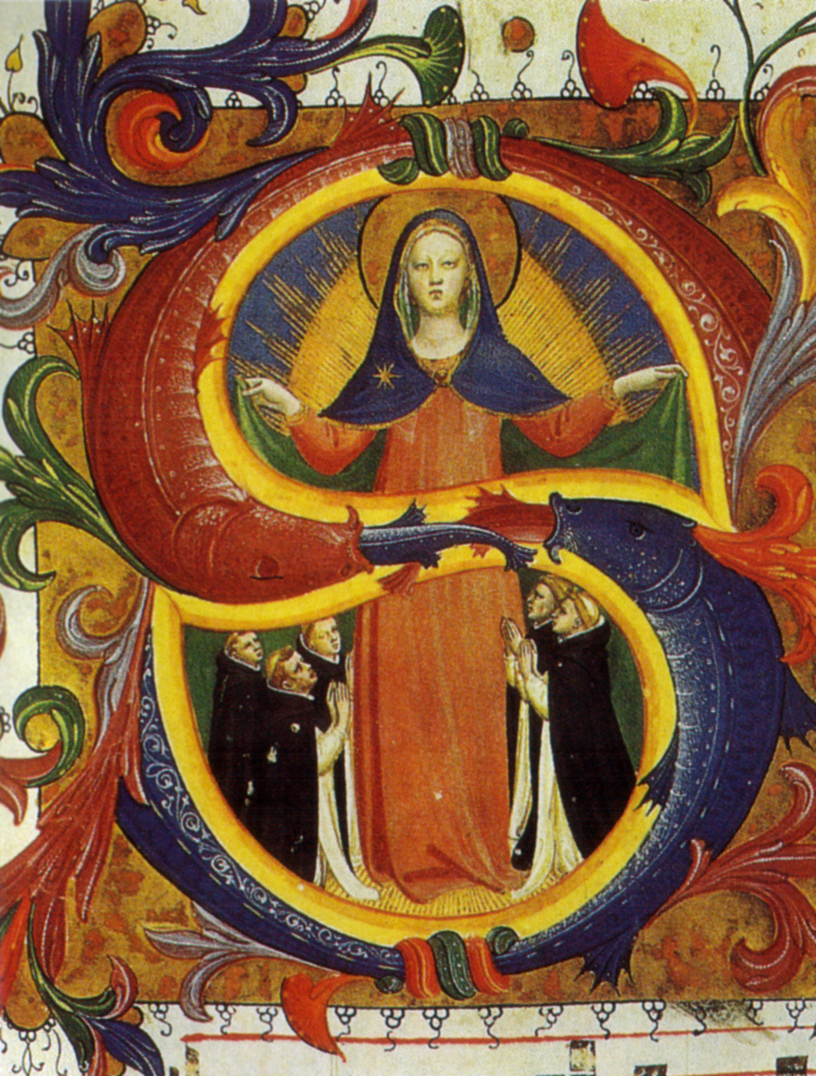
Initial from the Missal 558 of the Convent of San Marco, attributed to the studio of Fra Angelico.

In Italy, as well as elsewhere, illumination ceased to be an innovative art form and followed perceptible developments in other arts such as painting on wood, fresco, and sculpture. As with the latter, it gradually adopted innovations such as the use of perspective and the vanishing point, along with a concern for the realism of human anatomy, especially nudes. Finally, the influence of architecture can be seen in the creation of large frontispieces and margin decorations with colonnades and antique-style pediments. While some artists, such as Lorenzo Monaco, persisted in the International Gothic style until the end of their lives, others embraced these innovations both in illumination and in the other art forms they were practicing at the same time. These include Pisanello, Fra Angelico, Marco Zoppo, Giovanni di Paolo and Girolamo de'Corradi.

=== New materials and techniques ===
With the development of drawing in the 15th century, quill and ink illuminations gradually began to compete with painted miniatures. As the use of paper increased, more and more manuscripts were written and decorated on this material, although it did not completely replace parchment.

=== Types of works ===
The works produced had to stand out from the printed competition, as production was increasingly confined to a luxury clientele.

The humanism of the time led to a renewed demand for texts from Greco-Roman antiquity. A considerable number of manuscripts by Virgil, Suetonius, and Cicero were decorated and also the original Greek texts by Homer and Aristotle were copied and decorated.

The Book of Hours, the star book of the late Gothic period, continued to be produced but was printed in standardized forms, mostly for use in Rome. Some illuminators were also printers, such as Jean Pichore, who mass-produced printed religious works while continuing to supply an aristocratic clientele with luxurious manuscripts. Still, some collectors commissioned exceptional manuscripts. The Farnese Hours of Cardinal Farnese, painted by Giulio Clovio in Italy between 1537 and 1546, and the Heures d'Anne de Montmorency (c. 1550) in France are the most recent examples.

Many works from this period are also composed entirely of illustrations, although we do not know the precise purpose for which they were most often intended. This is the case of Histoire d'amour sans paroles, now in the Musée Condé.

== Production centers ==
=== Italy ===
The diversity of the artistic centers of Italian Renaissance illumination reflects its political fragmentation. While in Lombardy the tradition of l'enluminure gothique (Gothic illumination), exemplified by the Master of the Vitae Imperatorum, endured for a very long time, it was in Padua that the new style first appeared and flourished. Here, from the 1430s onwards, a group of "archaeological" humanists took a particular interest in ancient manuscripts, drawing inspiration from ancient motifs to create new decorations, dyeing parchment purple and creating frontispieces in the form of classical monuments. The calligraphers Felice Feliciano and Bartolomeo Sanvito, as well as Andrea Mantegna himself, were among the artists who contributed to the renewal of this art.

Although no extant manuscript is attributed to Mantegna himself, he undoubtedly influenced many illuminators in the rest of Italy. In particular, he influenced the brothers-in-law Leonardo and Giovanni Bellini in Venice, but also Girolamo de'Corradi, who worked in Mantua and Siena, where he decorated several cathedral choir books (corali), and finally in Florence. Other centers of production were Ferrara, where the d'Este family commissioned numerous works, including the Borso d'Este Bible, and Urbino, where Federico III da Montefeltro enriched his library with a Bible and a copy of the Divine Comedy.

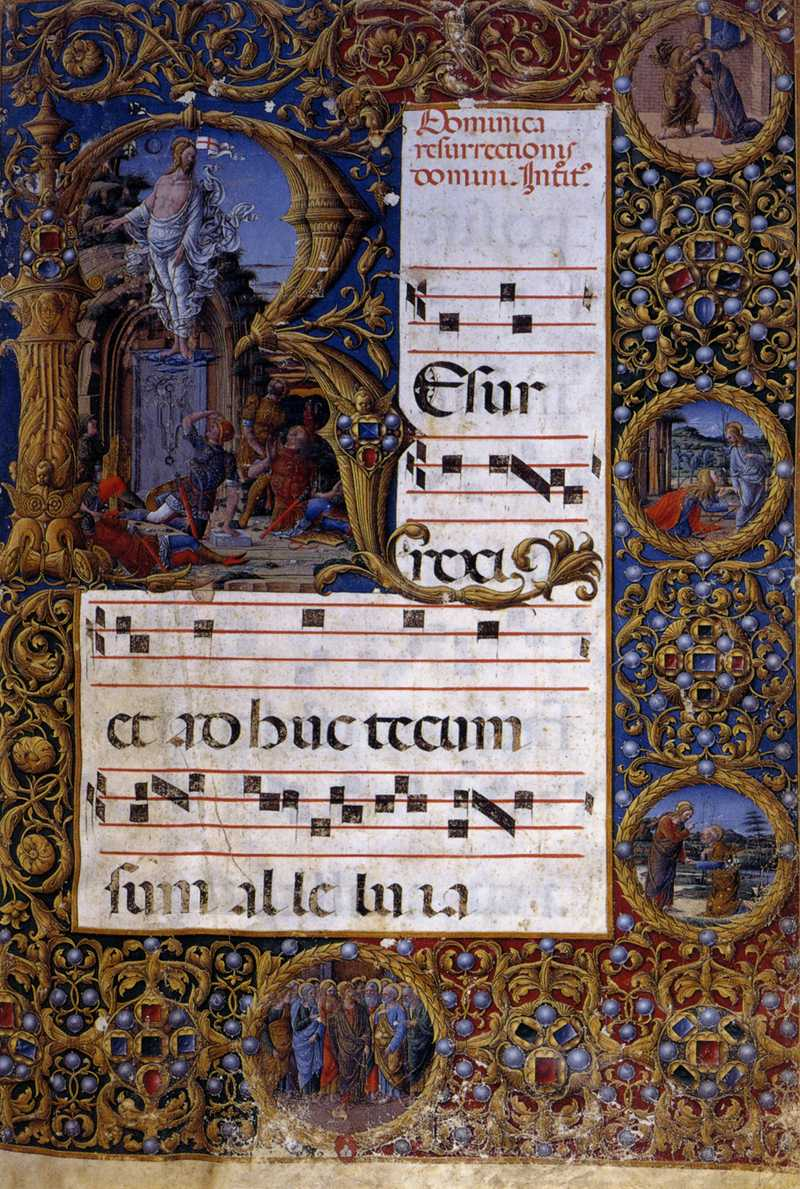
Corali by Girolamo de'Corradi, Siena.

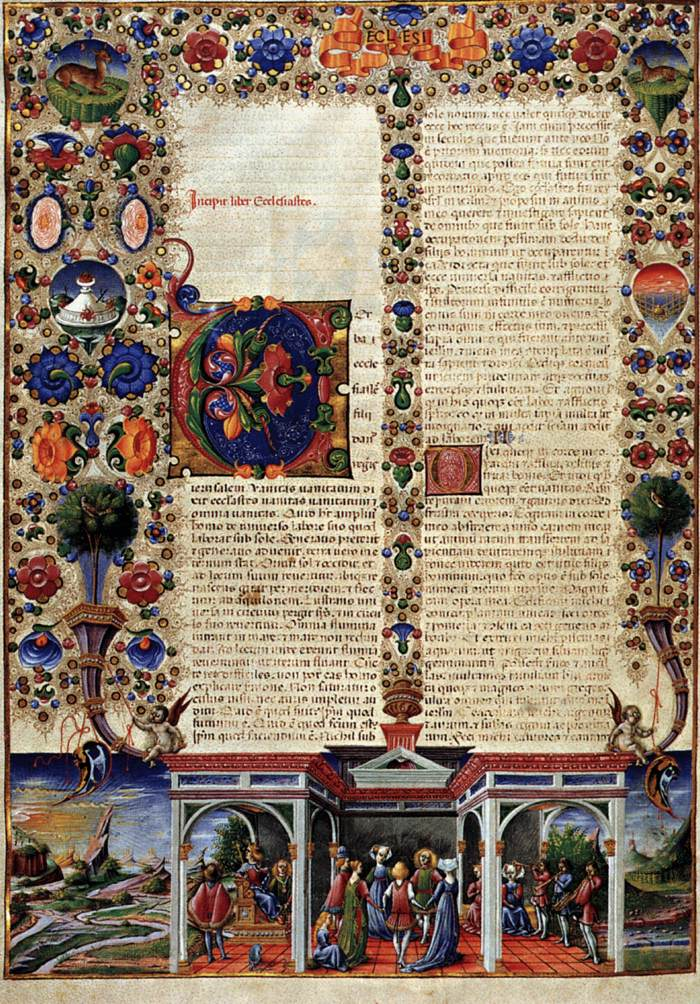
Borso d'Este Bible, Ferrara.

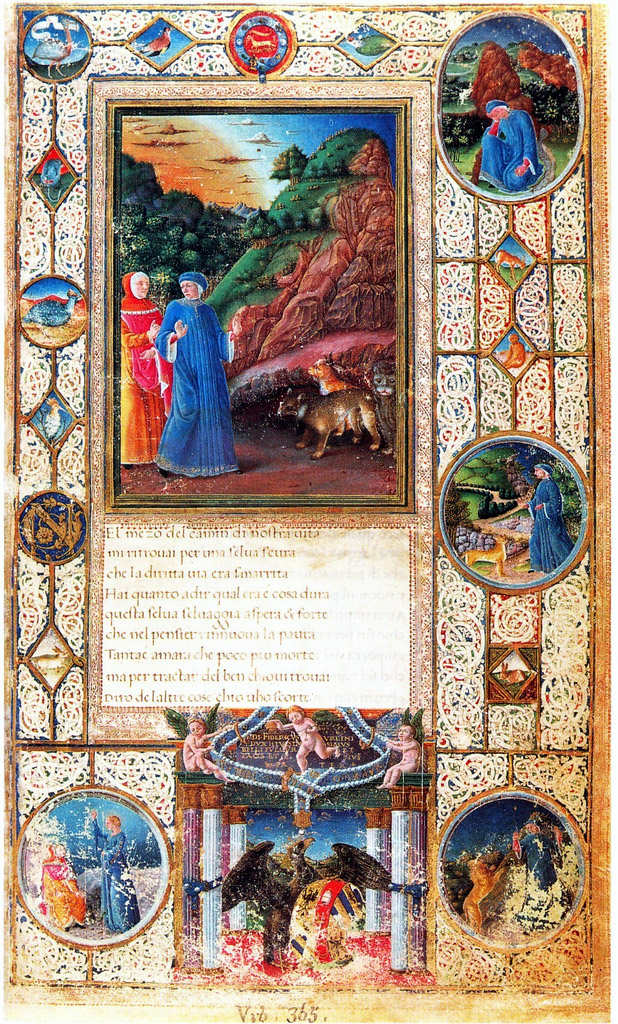
The Dante of Federico da Montefeltro, Urbino.

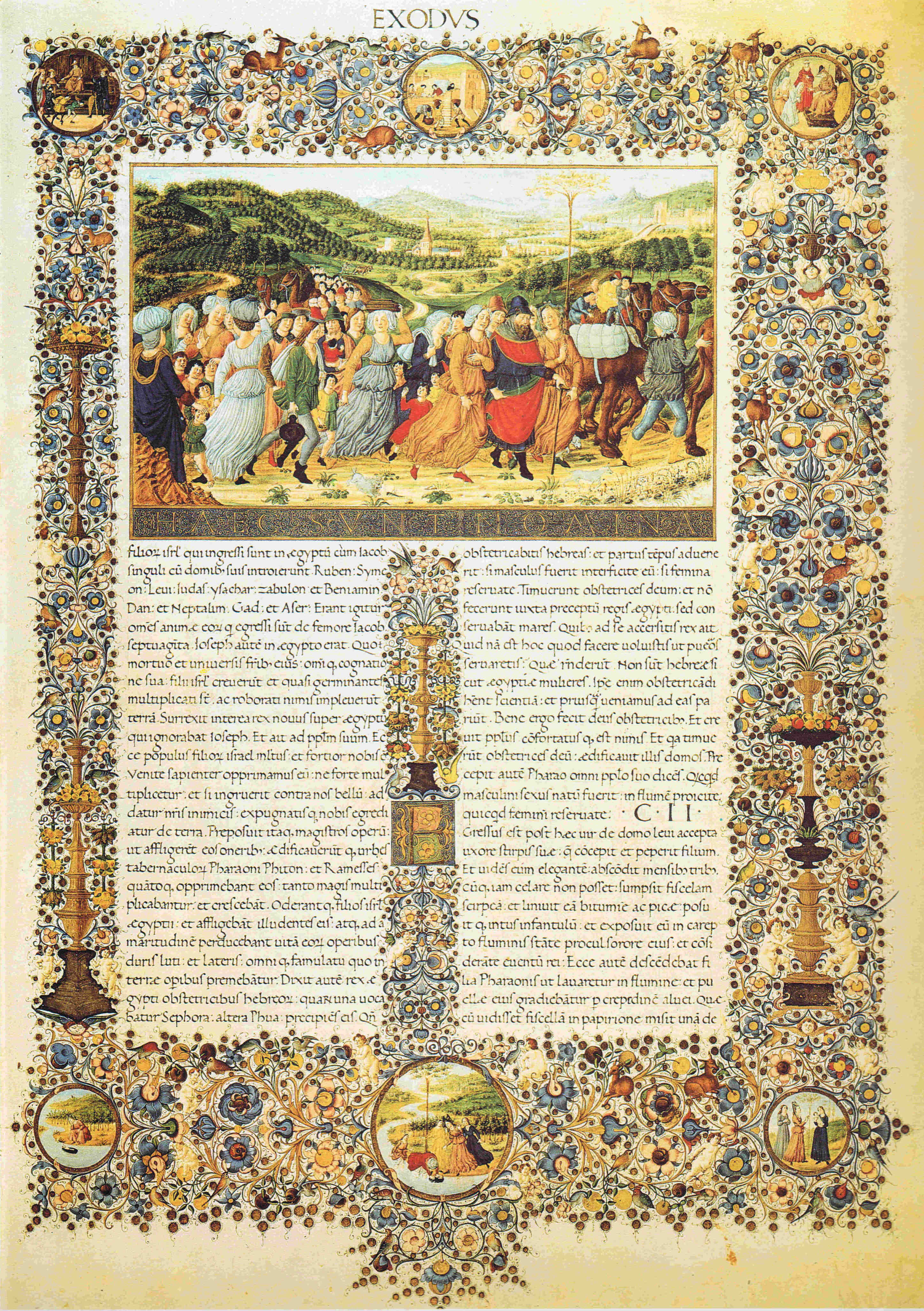
Bible of Federico da Montefeltro, Florence.

=== Low Countries ===
With the disappearance of the court of the Duke of Burgundy, illuminators had to change not only their clientele but also their style. As in Italy, they focused on a much more naturalistic depiction of figures, landscapes, and decorative borders, with illusionistic flora. They also innovated in new forms of representation, in the form of diptychs or triptychs, and in the art of portraiture, imported from panel painting, with full-length or half-length representations. Flemish illuminators, based mainly but not exclusively in Ghent and Bruges, specialized in the creation of personal liturgical works such as books of hours or richly illustrated breviaries for an aristocratic clientele spread throughout Europe. Orders came from the courts of Spain, Portugal, and Italy.

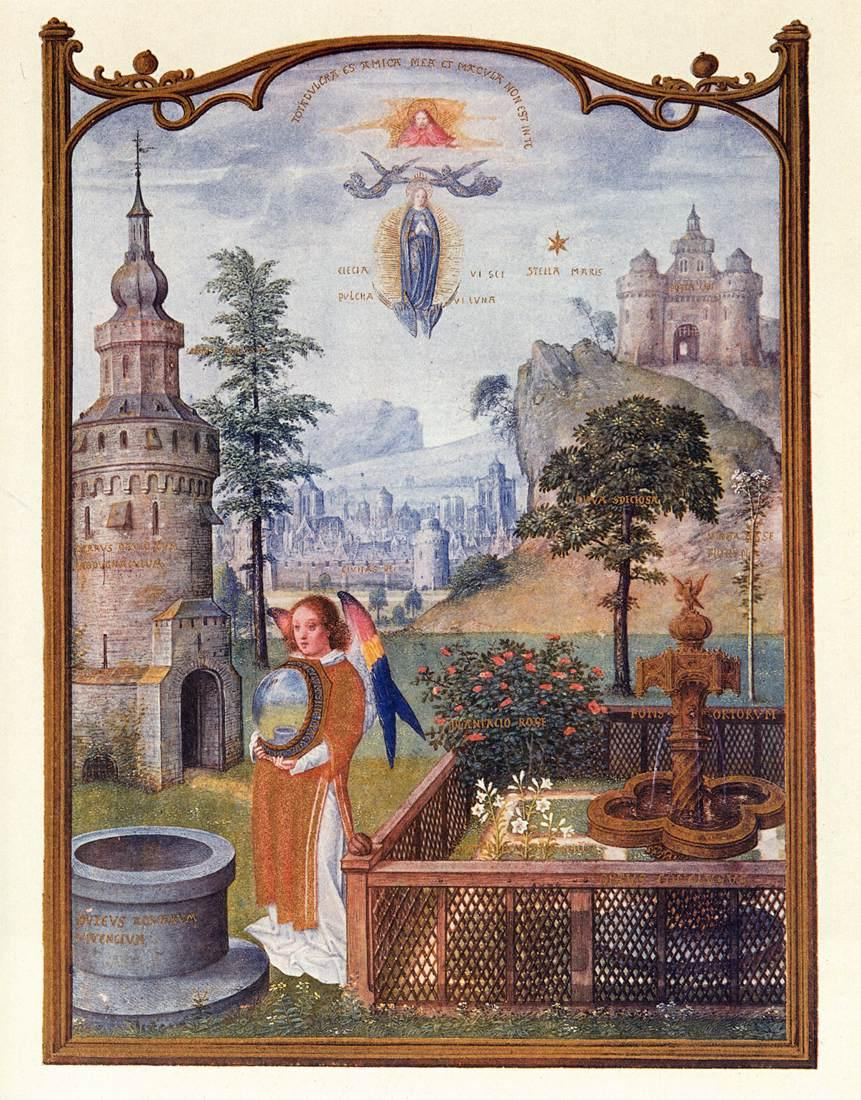
Miniature from the Grimani Breviary attributed to Simon Bening.

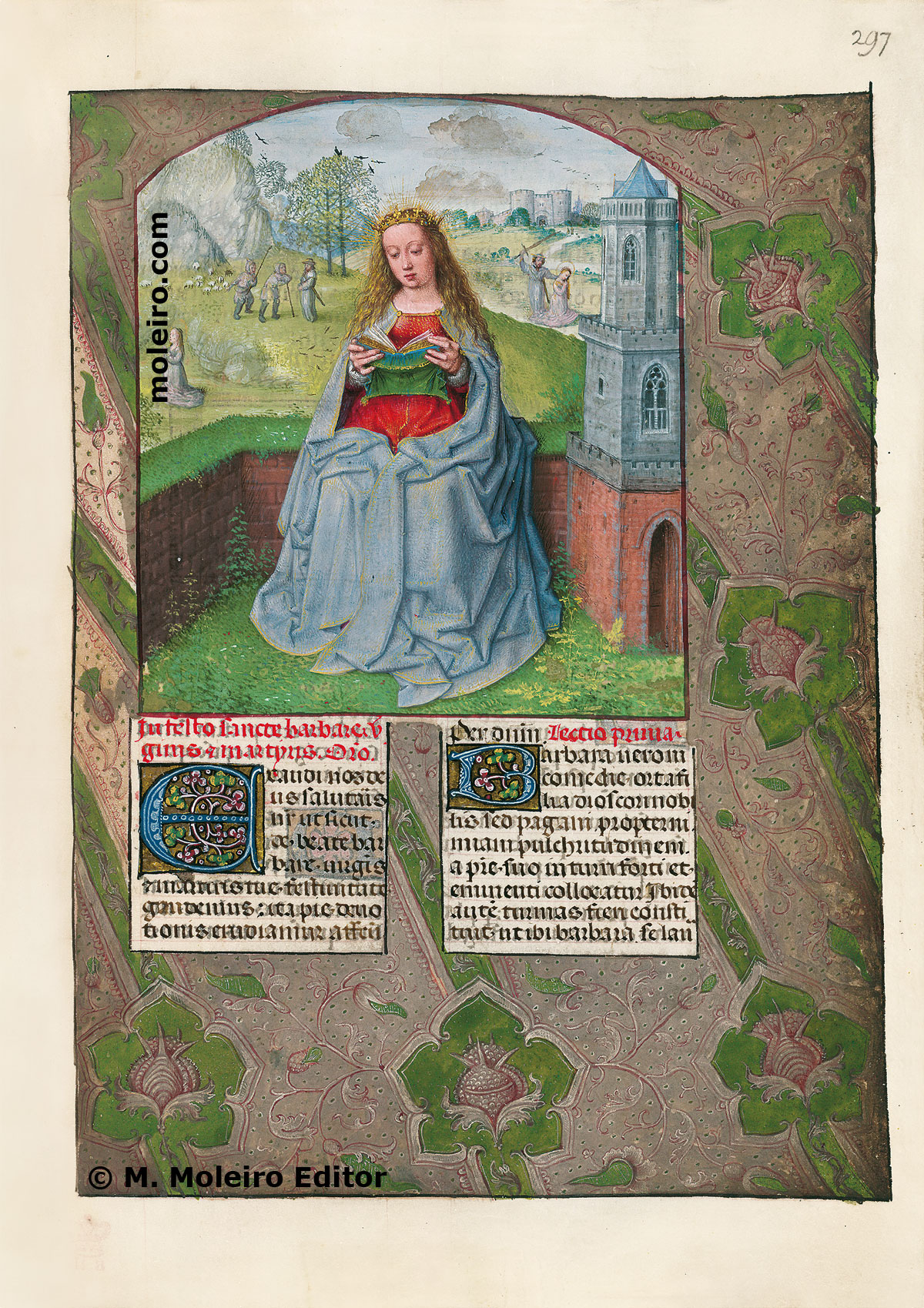
Miniature from the Isabella Breviary attributed to Gérard David.

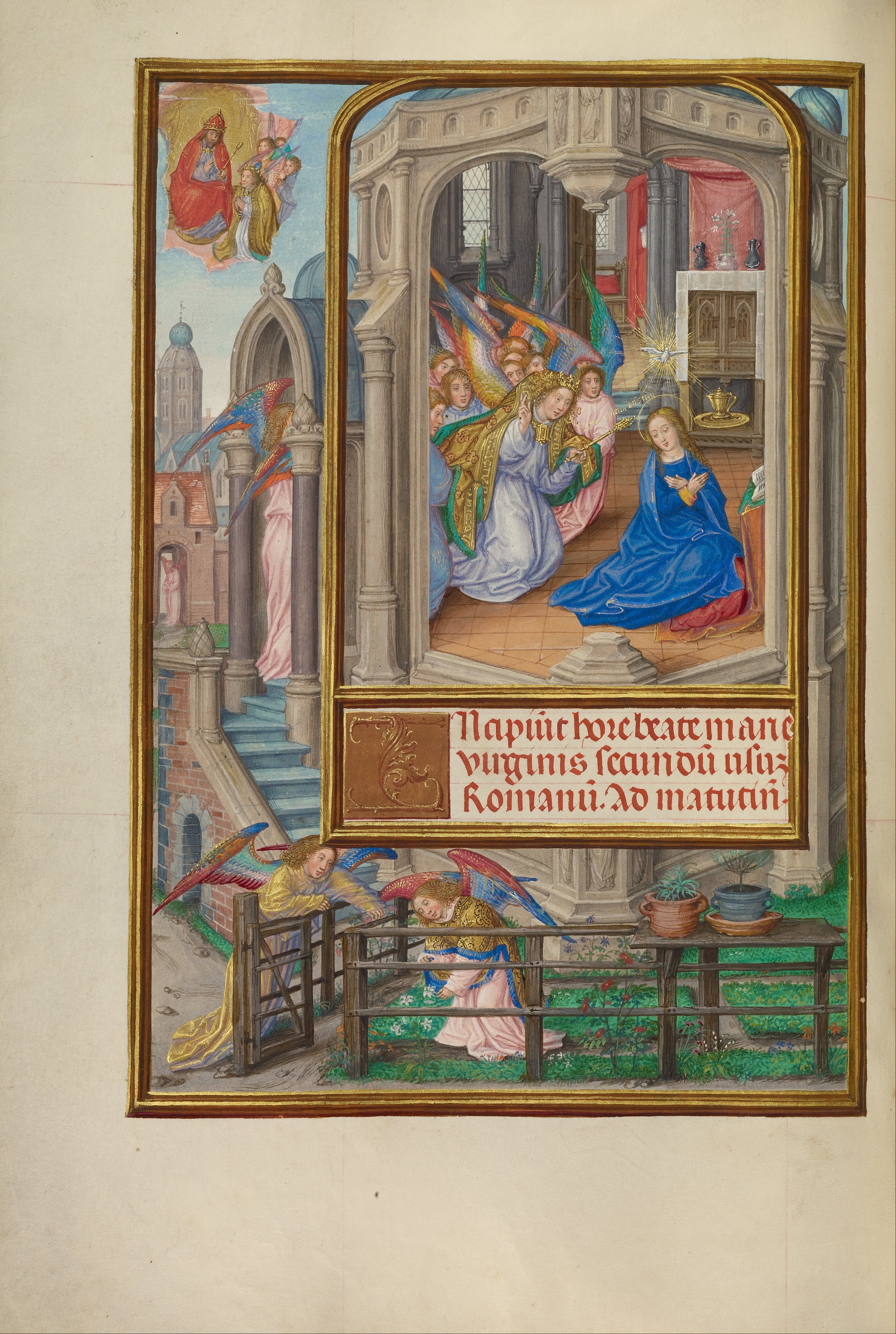
Miniature from the Spinola Book of Hours attributed to Gerard Horenbout.

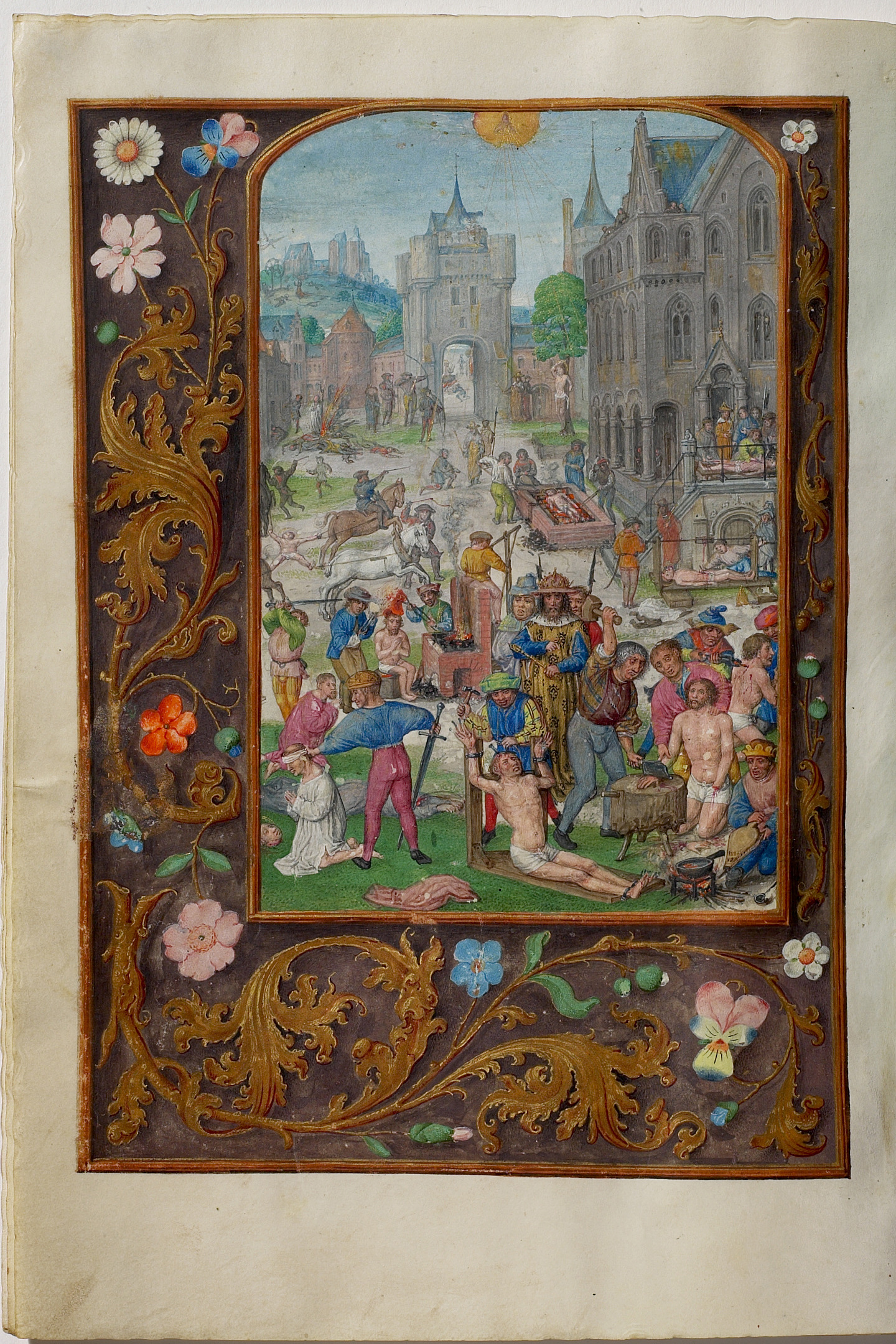
Miniature from the Mayer van den Bergh Breviary, a lavish example of the tradition of the Ghent-Bruges school

=== France ===
From the first half of the 15th century, French illuminators were sensitive to the influence of Flemish Primitives, through drawings and models, but also the arrival of Flemish artists, particularly in Paris, such as André d'Ypres. This influence was marked by a search for greater realism, both in the use of perspective in landscapes and in the depiction of figures. It was not until the second half of the century that the influence of the Italian Renaissance was felt in the kingdom. At first, this influence was very occasional, with a few individuals who had the opportunity to travel to Italy, such as Jean Fouquet, who later settled in Tours, or Barthélemy d'Eyck at the court of René d'Anjou. Other innovative painters settled in Provence, such as Enguerrand Quarton, who worked with René d'Anjou's master. The Italian influence became more widespread with the next generation: Jean Bourdichon and Jean Poyet in Tours, Jean Perréal in Lyon, and Jean Hey at the Bourbon court. These painters, who were illuminators as well as easel painters, all applied the innovations of panel painting to miniatures: on a full page, they depicted half-length figures and architectural elements inspired by antiquity. They were also inspired by the Ghent–Bruges school and adopted its floral decorations.

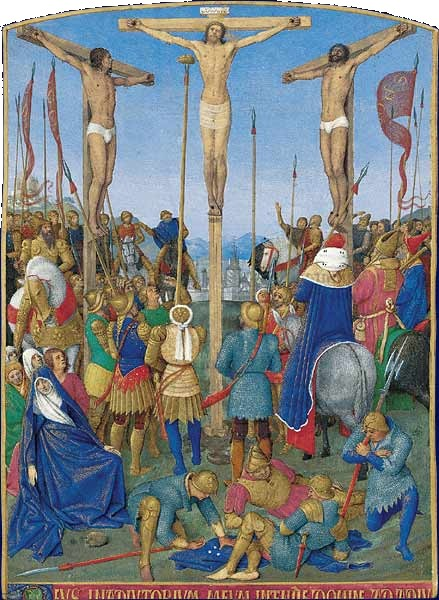
The Crucifixion from the Book of Hours of Étienne Chevalier, Jean Fouquet.

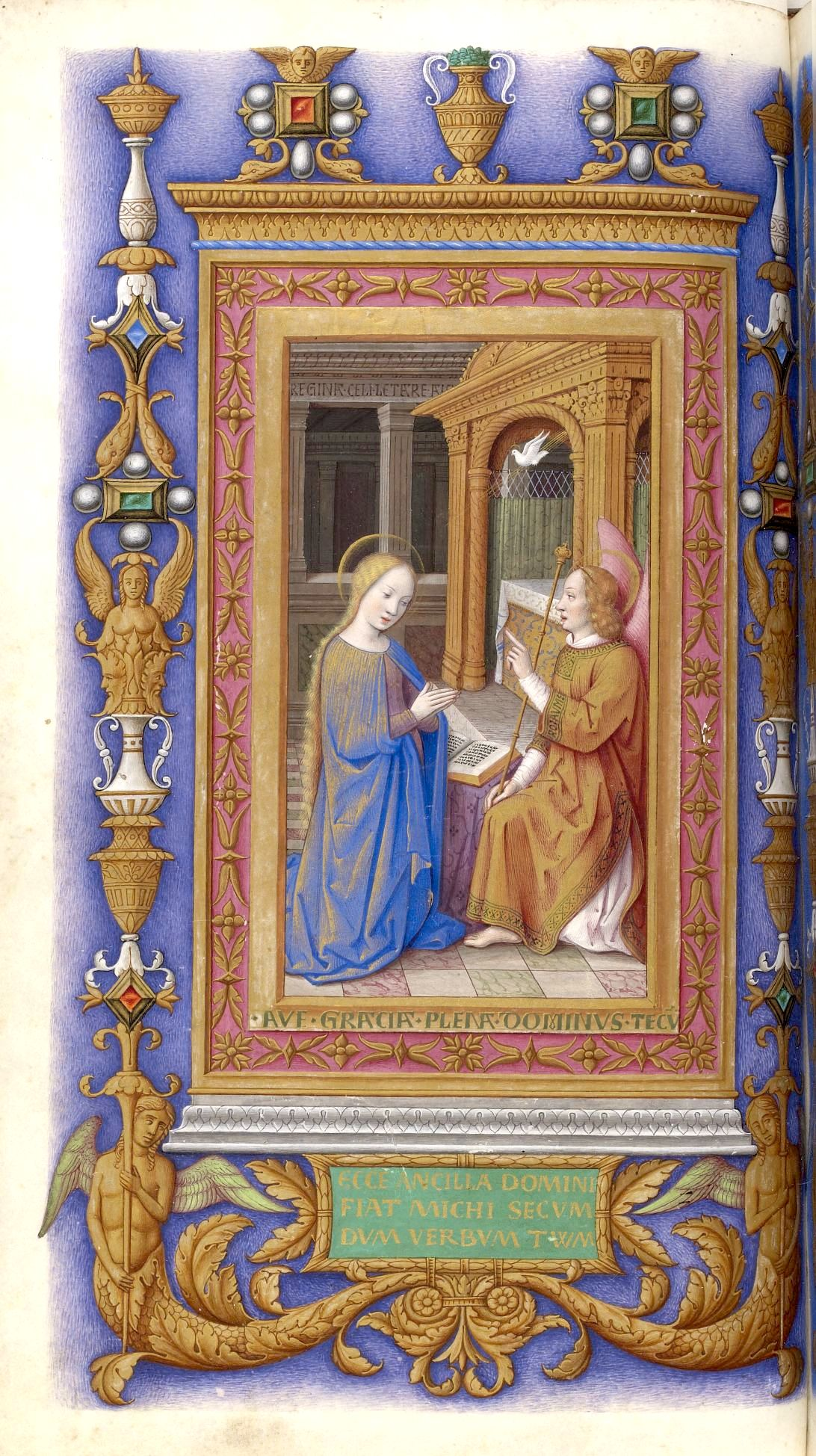
Annunciation from the Hours of Frédéric d'Aragon, Jean Bourdichon.

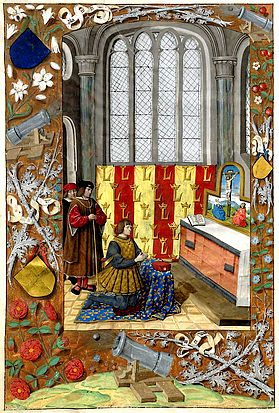
Louis XII in prayer, Jean Perréal.

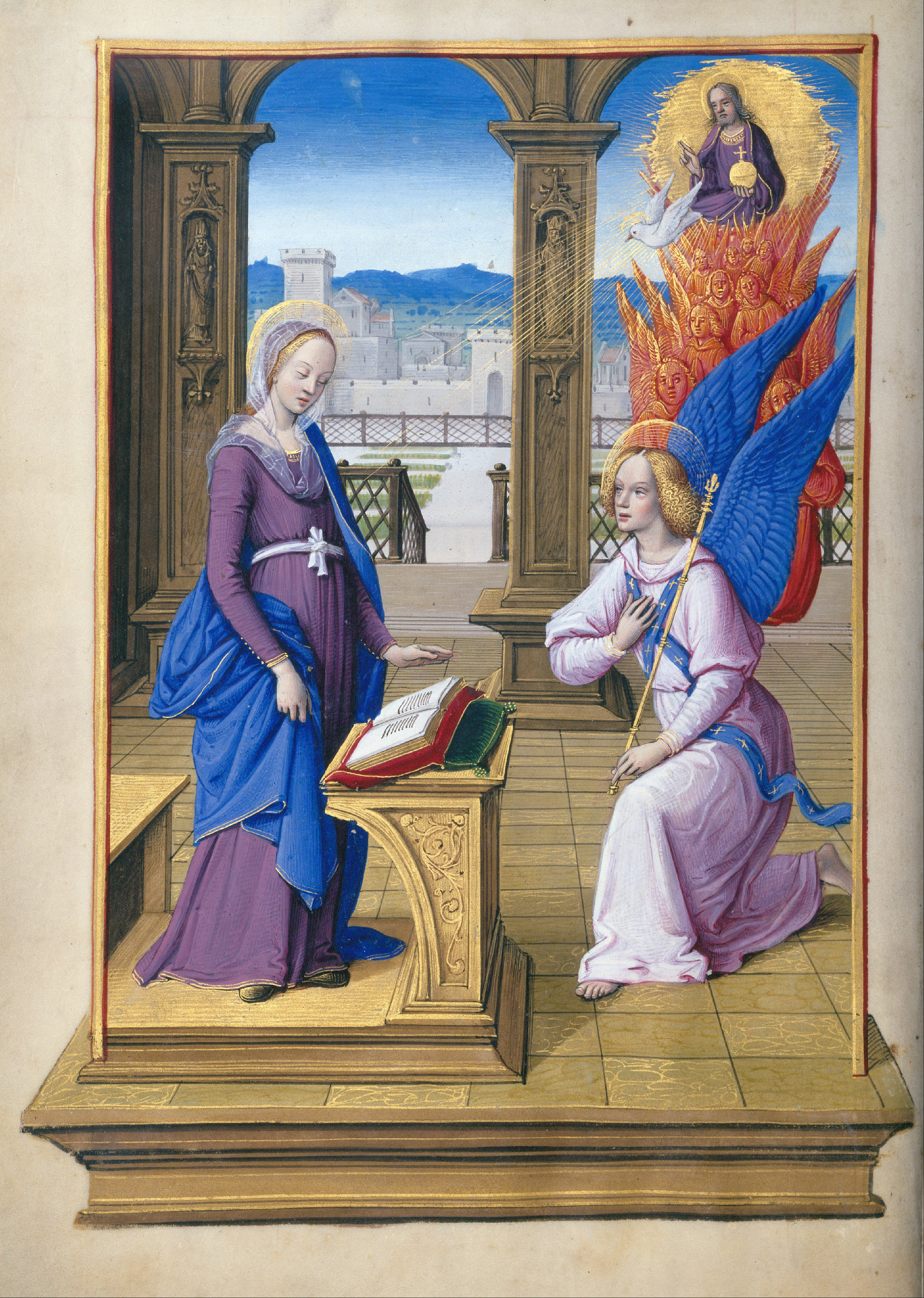
Annunciation from the Hours of Henry VIII by Jean Poyer.

== See also ==
=== Bibliography ===
- Avril, François; Reynaud, Nicole (1993). Les manuscrits à peintures en France, 1440-1520 (in French). Flammarion. ISBN 9782080121769.
- Scailliérez, Cécile; Stirnemann, Patricia (2001). L'Art du manuscrit de la Renaissance en France (in French). Somogy Editions D'art. ISBN 978-2850564970.
- Alexander, J.J.G. (1977). Manuscrits de la Renaissance italienne (in French). Paris: CHENE. ISBN 9782851081407.
- McKendrick, Scot; Kren, Thomas, eds. (2003). Illuminating the Renaissance: The Triumph of Flemish Manuscript Painting in Europe. ISBN 978-0892367047.
- Alexander, J. J. G. (1994). The Painted Page: Italian Renaissance Book Illumination, 1450–1550. Prestel. ISBN 978-3791313856.
- Alexander, Jonathan J. G. (2016). The Painted Book in Renaissance Italy 1450-1600. Yale University Press. ISBN 978-0300203981.

== See also ==
- The Missal of Thomas James
