= Bartolomeo d'Antonio Varnucci =

15th century Florentine illuminator

Bartolomeo d'Antonio Varnucci (c. 1412/13 – 1479) was a Florentine illuminator.

Bartolomeo d'Antonio Varnucci was active in Florence from around 1440, and during the early years of his career worked closely with his brother Giovanni (died 1459). Also later he frequently worked together with other artists, e.g. Ser Ricciardo di Nanni. His oevre is concentrated to liturgical books, including books of hours, and among his clients were religious institutions such as Badia Fiorentina, Florence Cathedral and the Territorial Abbey of Monte Oliveto Maggiore. Other clients included the early printing press Tipografia di San Jacopo di Ripoli, and also important lay persons such as Emperor Sigismund. Stylistically, Bartolomeo d'Antonio Varnucci was relatively conservative but could also display innovation. He has been described as inferior in style compared to some contemporary Florentine illuminators such as Gherardo di Giovanni del Fora and Francesco di Antonio del Chierico, but towards the middle of the century he still took on a leading role in Florentine illumination.
