= Bible of Federico da Montefeltro =

Illuminated manuscript containing the Vulgate text

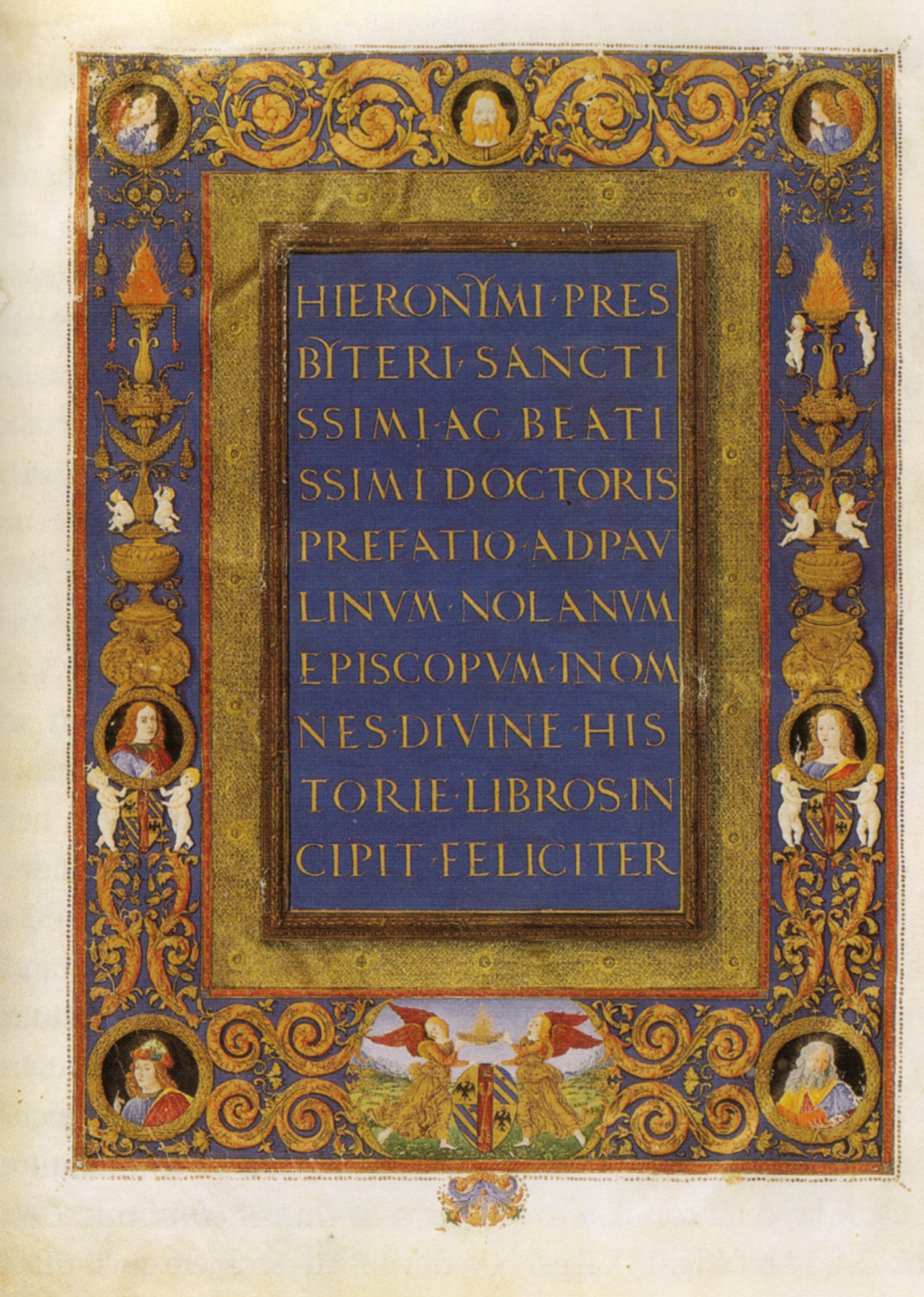
- Front page of the book, f.1v
- Artist: Francesco d'Antonio del Chierico, Attavante degli Attavanti, Davide Ghirlandaio, Domenico Ghirlandaio, Francesco Rosselli, Biagio di Antonio Tucci, Bartolomeo di Giovanni
- Year: 1476-1478
- Catalogue: Ms.Urb.Lat.1 et 2
- Dimensions: 59,8 cm × 44,3 cm (235 in × 174 in)
- Location: Vatican Apostolic Library; Vatican City

The Bible of Federico da Montefeltro or Bibbia Urbinate is an illuminated manuscript containing the Vulgate text. It was commissioned by Federico III da Montefeltro and produced in Florence between 1476 and 1478. Now, it is housed in the Vatican Apostolic Library (Urb.Lat.1 and 2).

== History ==
The Bible was commissioned by Federico III da Montefeltro, Condottiero, and Duke of Urbino, through his Florentine book merchant, Vespasiano da Bisticci. For the text of the Vulgate, he commissioned the copyist Hugues Commineau de Mézières. For the miniatures, he enlisted Francesco d'Antonio del Chierico, whom several other artists assisted. The work was completed in a record time of two years, in 1478.

In 1657, the entire library of the Dukes of Urbino became part of the Vatican Apostolic Library.

== Description ==
The large manuscript contains a text of the Vulgate, bound in 2 volumes of 482 and 622 pages each. It was intended for display rather than for daily consultation. The two volumes are decorated with 35 miniatures at the head of each book, illustrating a scene from the first chapter of the book and forming small independent paintings. Historiated medallions complete the illustration of the text and each miniature is surrounded by a floral margin.

In addition to Francesco d'Antonio del Chierico, several other artists have been identified as contributors to the miniatures: Attavante degli Attavanti, Davide Ghirlandaio, Domenico Ghirlandaio, Francesco Rosselli, Biagio di Antonio Tucci, Bartolomeo di Giovanni and the Master of Xenophon Hamilton. These artists are also known for their paintings of frescoes and wood panels.

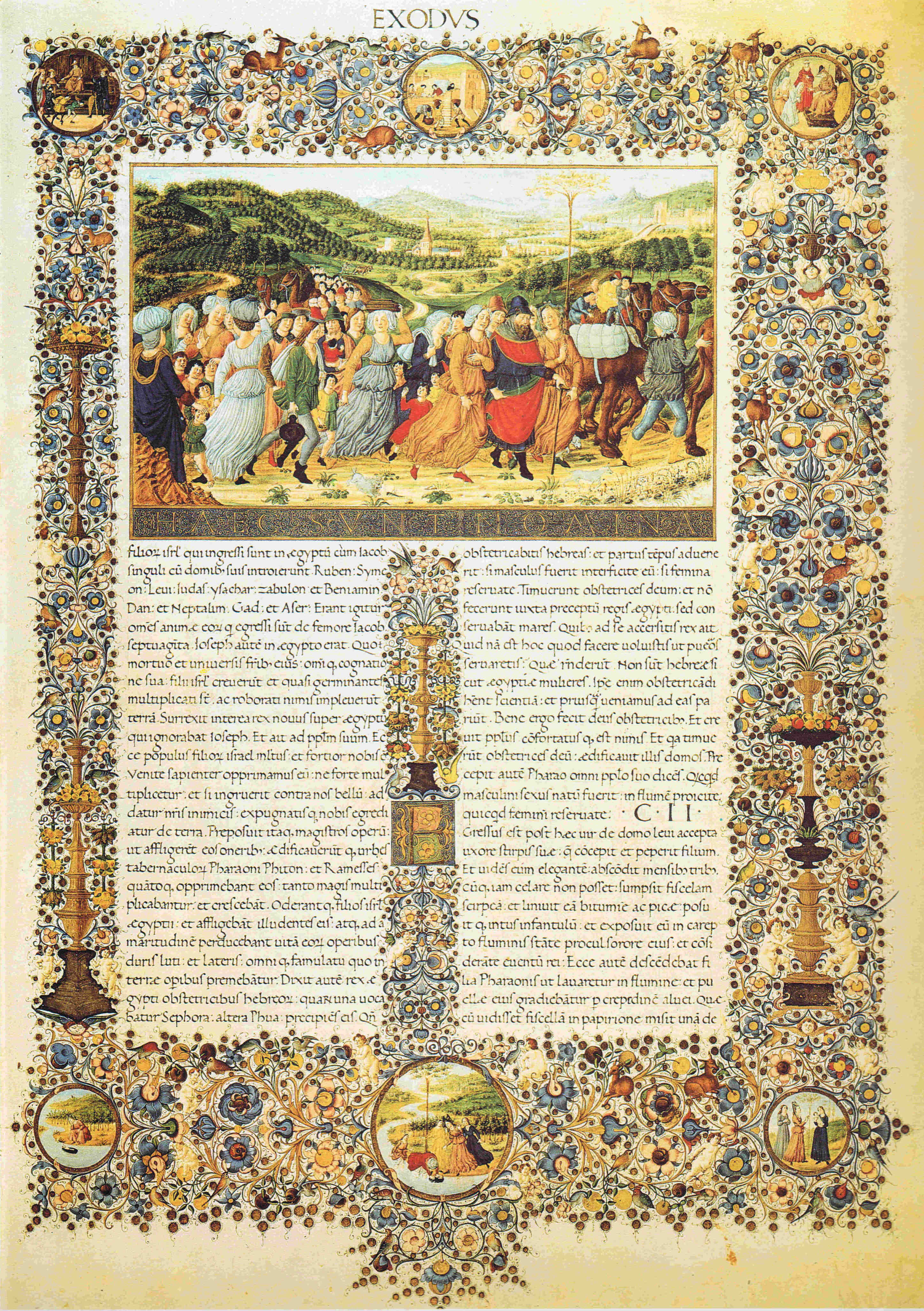
First page of the book of Exodus: the entry of the Jews into Egypt, f.27r.

Francesco Rosselli is the author of the frontispiece, which contains the first words of St. Jerome's letter to St. Paulin, written in gold capital letters. The borders are decorated with scrolls and candelabras, as well as two medallions with idealized portraits of Federico da Montefeltro and his wife Battista Sforza.

== See also ==
=== Bibliography ===
- Garzelli, Annarosa (1977). La Bibbia di Federico da Montefeltro : Un'officina libraria fiorentina 1476-1478 (in Italian). Rome: Multigrafica.
- Piazzoni, Ambrogio M. (2004). La Bibbia di Federico da Montefeltro : Codici Urbinati latini 1-2, Biblioteca apostolica vaticana (in Italian). Vol. 4. Modena: Franco Cosimo Panini. ISBN 9788882902209.
- Walther, Ingo; Wolf, Norbert (2001). Codices illustres. Les plus beaux manuscrits enluminés du monde (400-1600) (in French). Translated by Fruhtrunk Wolf. Taschen. pp. 374–375. ISBN 3-8228-4748-8.

== See also ==
- Renaissance illumination

=== External links ===
- Biblioteca Apostólica Vaticana
- Bible of Federico da Montefeltro
