= Tavola Strozzi =

Painting by Francesco Rosselli

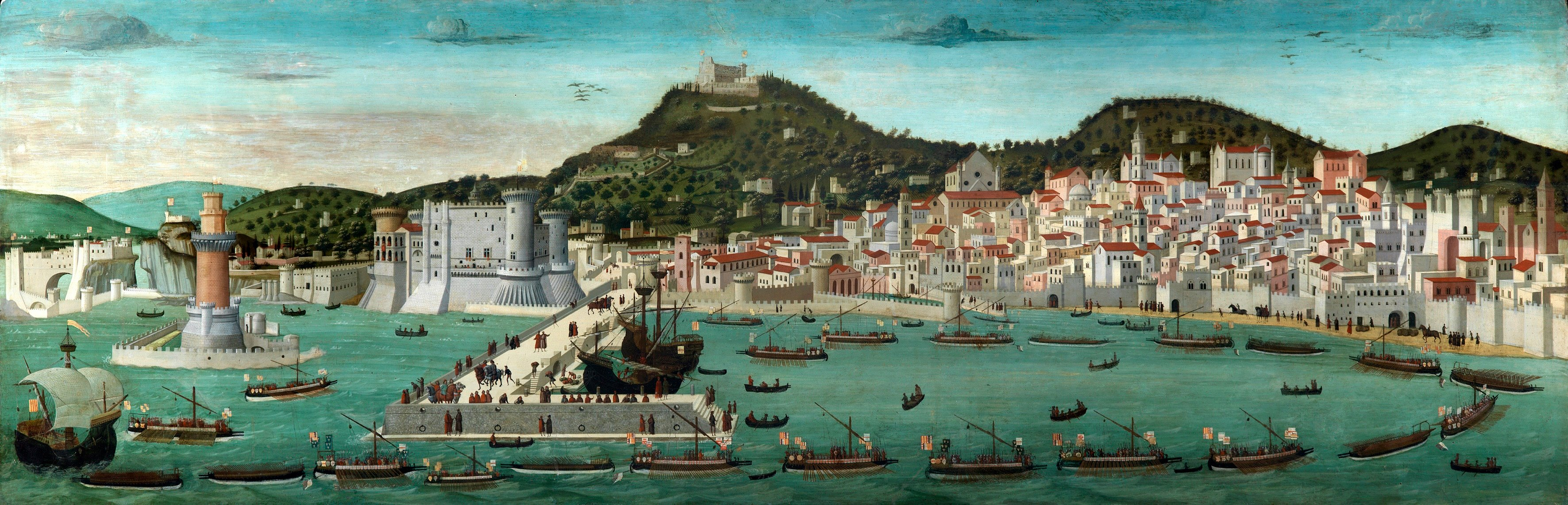
- Artist: Francesco Rosselli
- Year: 1472-1473
- Medium: Tempera, Panel painting
- Dimensions: 82 cm × 245 cm (32 in × 96 in)
- Location: National Museum of San Martino, Naples

The Tavola Strozzi is a painting made using tempera on wood and attributed to Francesco Rosselli, datable to 1472-1473 and kept in the National Museum of San Martino in Naples. It represents a view of Naples from the 15th century.
