= Christ and the Virgin Mary Interceding for Humanity =

c. 1490 painting by Gherardo di Giovanni del Fora

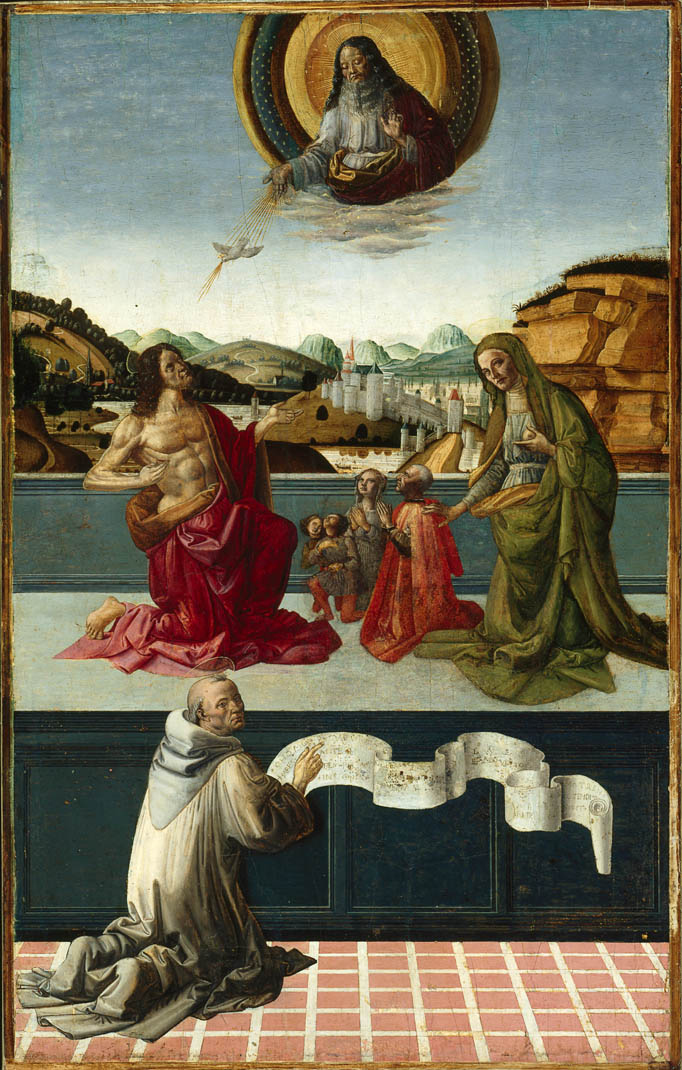
Christ and the Virgin Mary Interceding for Humanity (c. 1490) by Gherardo di Giovanni del Fora

Christ and the Virgin Mary Interceding for Humanity is a c. 1490 painting in oil and tempera on panel by Gherardo di Giovanni del Fora, a painter from the entourage of Domenico Ghirlandaio. It is now in the Montreal Museum of Fine Arts, which bought it using a legacy from the John W. Tempest Foundation. In the foreground is a saint, probably Bernard of Clairvaux (the Virgin's breast recalls the Lactation of Saint Bernard).
