= Francesco di Antonio del Chierico =

Italian painter

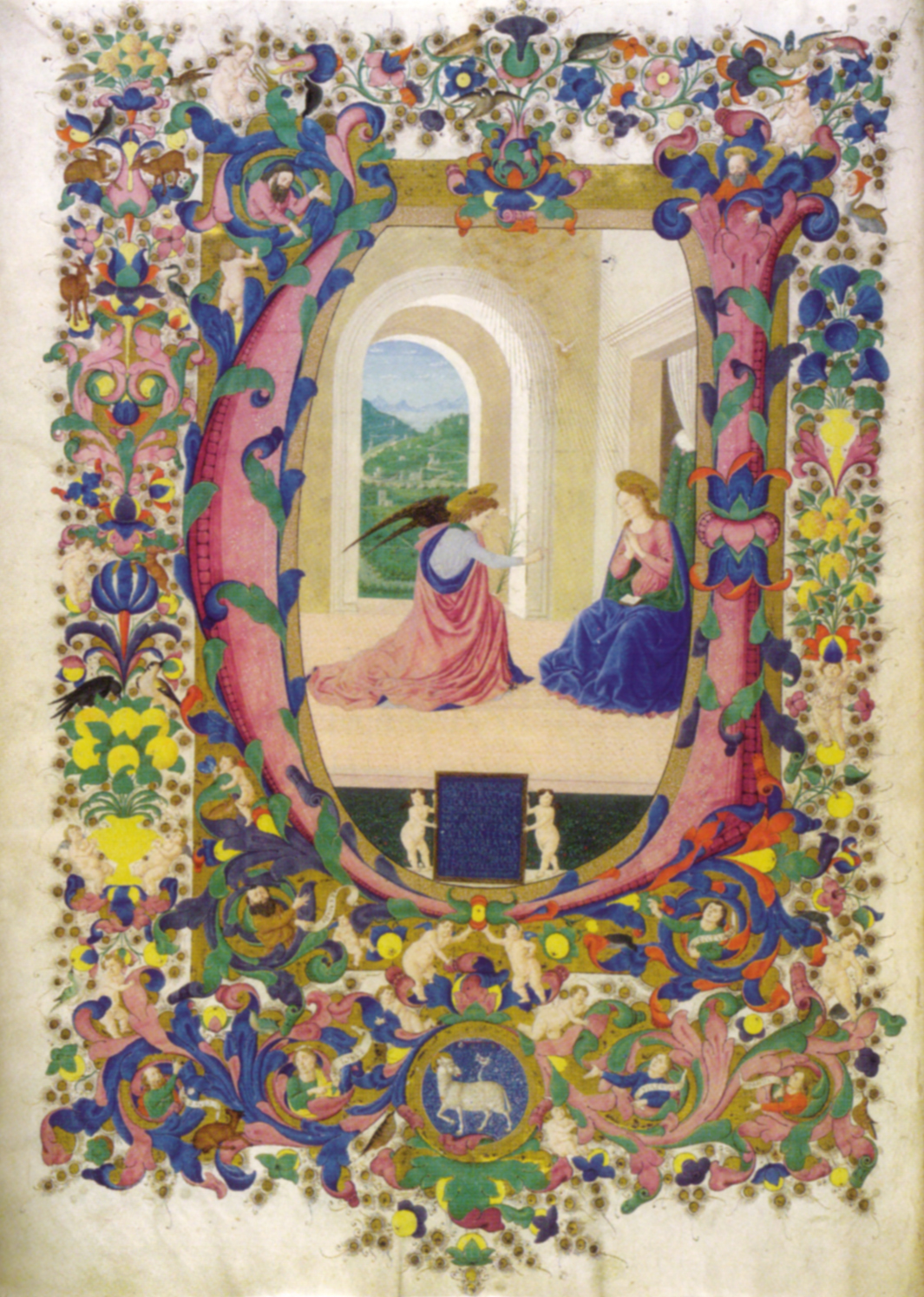
Francesco di Antonio del Chierico, Annunciazione, graduale edili 151, f 1v., Biblioteca medicea laurenziana

Francesco di Antonio del Chierico (1433–1484) was a manuscript illuminator of the early Renaissance period in Florence. Francesco began as a goldsmith before changing occupations to become a successful illustrator. He was one of the pupils of Fra Angelico and became famous for being Lorenzo de' Medici's favorite illuminator. He worked under some of the most prestigious patrons of the time, including Lorenzo de' Medici (otherwise known as Lorenzo the Magnificent), Piero de’ Cosimo de' Medici, Cosimo il Vecchio, and Vespasiano da Bisticci. He gained a reputation for his well executed illustrations in varying types of books ranging in size from small books of hours to large choir books. His illustrations often included intricate floral arrangements, putti, and candelabras. He decorated both the borders of manuscripts and full pages.

Francesco's works are often compared to those of the Pollaiuolo brothers and Domenico Veneziano. He is most recognized for his work on the Disputationes Camaldulenses by Cristoforo Landino and in that manuscript, particularly the two profiles of Federico da Montefeltro and an unidentified figure. In his later life, it is speculated that he was the master of Francesco Rosselli due to their strong stylistic similarities. There is often confusion with his name due to the many Francesco di Antonios or Francesco del Chiericos from 15th- and 16th-century Italy.

== Adult life ==
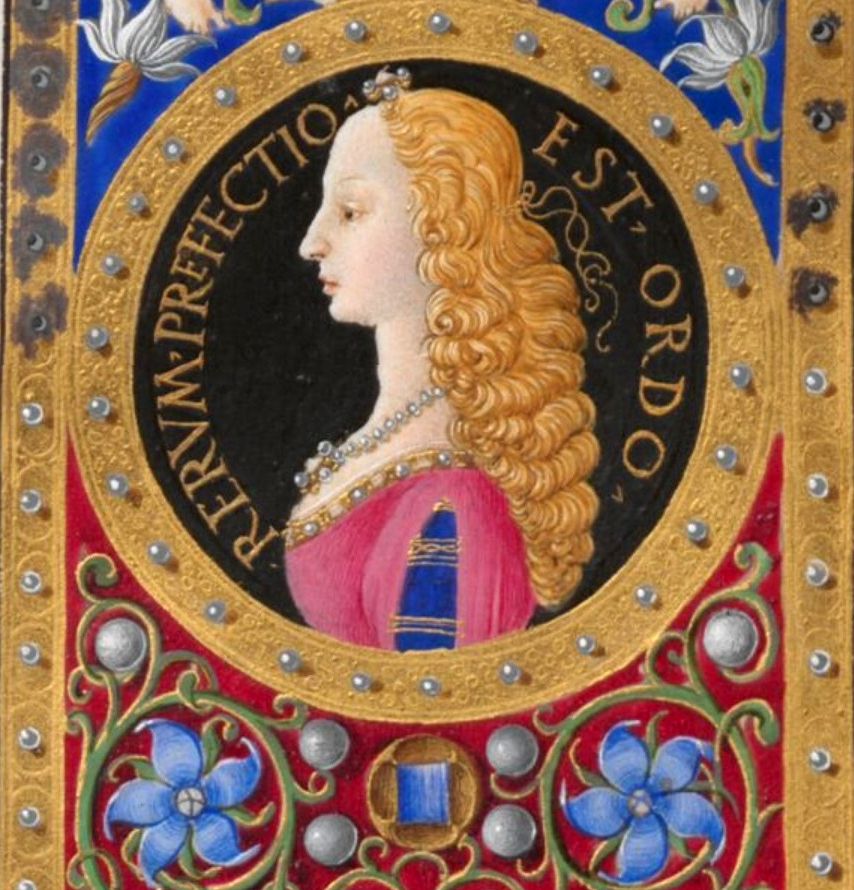
Portrait of Beatrix of Naples (Beatrix of Aragon), Codex Regiomontanus, 15th century; Austrian National Library

Francesco began his work as a goldsmith before turning to illuminating. No information has been uncovered about his family as a child or adult, or about how he began illuminating. Goldsmiths turned illuminists were very common at the time because goldsmiths were trained to create fine details in their work which translated well for illustrating tiny books. He was creative in the details he included in his work. For example, in Book of Hours of Lorenzo the Magnificent and Clarice Orsini he incorporates astrological symbols that correspond with each member of their family into his designs. This pleased the Medici so much that they hired him again to work on more books for them. Through Francesco's work it is also clear that he had at least some knowledge of ancient Roman works. In the fifteenth century, Roman works were popular, but only known to the public through descriptions and copies by famous artists. Only the best artists of the time were able to see the uncovered Roman works and less famous artists rarely got a chance. Nevertheless, it was very popular for artists to replicate the classics to the best of their abilities through descriptions of the Roman works. Francesco designed his floral arrangements and the many putti in a classical Roman way throughout his works. Putti are commonly shown in Renaissance art; they are depictions of small naked children or, more typically, cherubs. Francesco's boldness and creativeness is exemplified by the numerous putti, candelabras, and the use of a rare sketch watercolor technique.

Francesco was also recorded to have been enrolled in the Compagnia di San Paolo in Florence which was one of the minor guilds for doctors and apothecaries. There was not a specific guild for artists so many relocated to the guild of doctors and apothecaries because it was common practice for artists to buy their pigment from the apothecaries. It was not until the 16th century that a guild specifically for artists was created. These guilds are important to history because most of them kept meticulous documents on who joined them and what art they created.

Francesco was often compared to the Pollaiuolo brothers in terms of his artistic style. Antonio del Pollaiuolo was renowned for his skill in depicting the human figure and was one of the first artists to practice anatomical dissection. Pollaiuolo's style has been described as pure and sober, except for his female faces which are comparable to bright elegance of the madonnas created by Baldovinetti. Francesco and Antonio del Pollaiuolo's landscapes were very similar which can be seen in the composition of three Marys at the Tomb (E 204, fol. 2v), or in the Communion of the Apostles (fol. 169r). Piero del Pollaiuolo, the other brother, also has direct links to inspiring Francesco. In Francesco's Disputationes he represents his connection to Piero through a design on rug. The pattern on the rug is exactly the same as one Piero used in one of his work, but instead of a rug he had the pattern featured on a throne. Francesco was also compared by the art historian Annaroza Garzelli to Domenico Veneziano in terms of his luminosity.

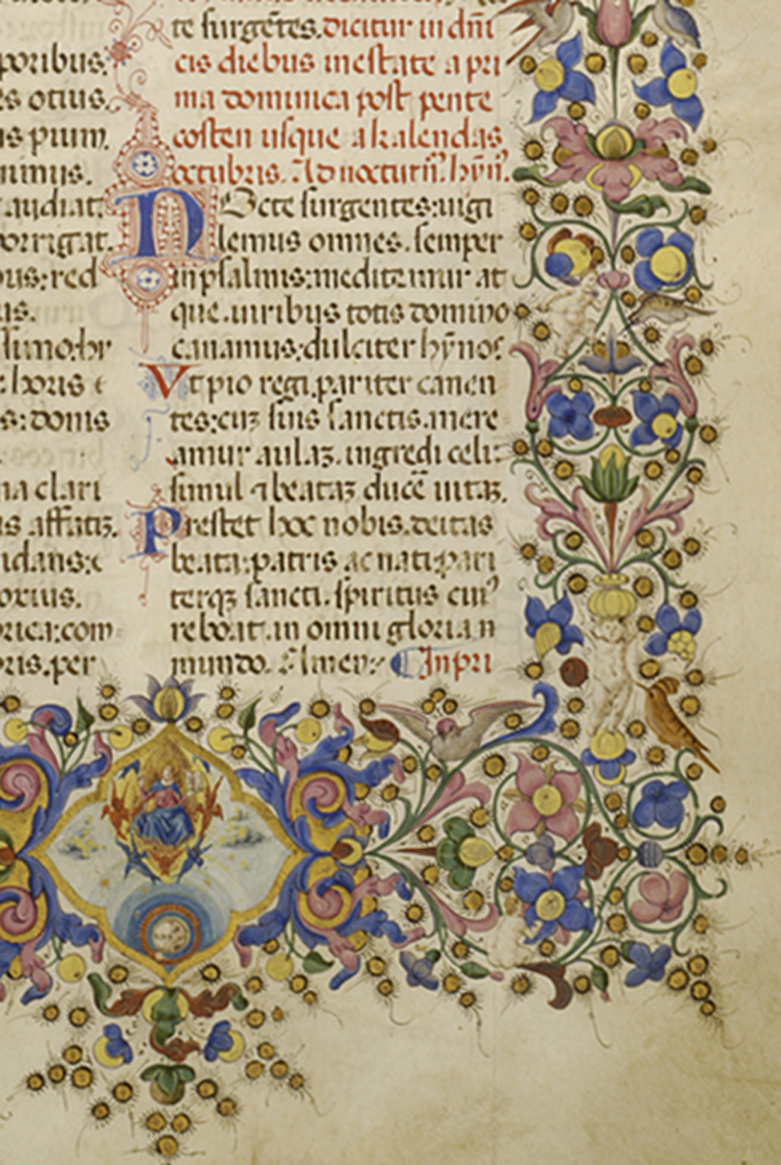
Francesco di Antonio del Chierico - Breviary - Walters W334 - Obverse Detail

== Works ==
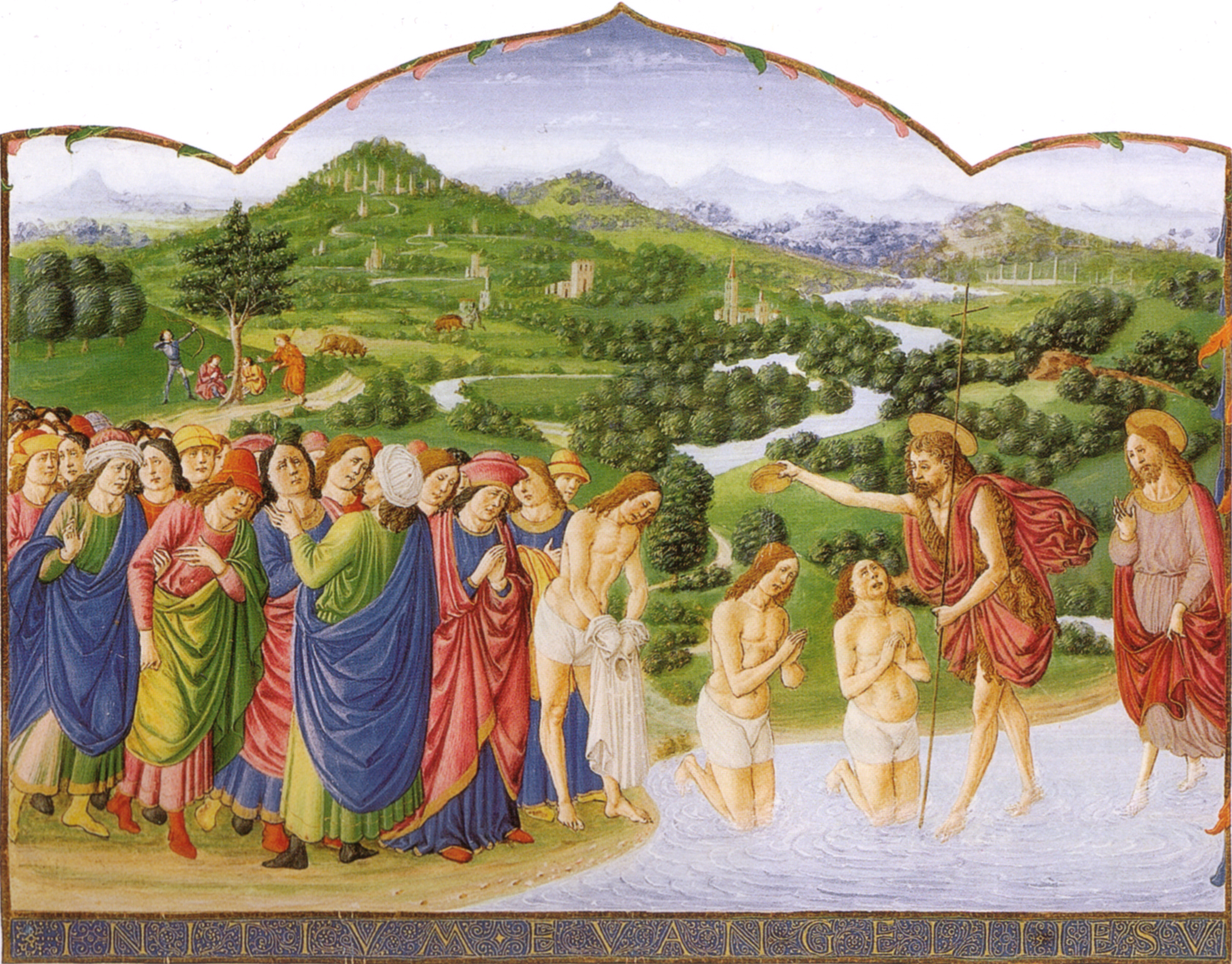
Saint Jean-Baptiste, Urb. lat. 2, fol. 215r

The books Francesco illustrated ranged in all sizes and covered varied literary, scientific, historical, and religious topics. He produced works for the book merchant Vespasiano da Bisticci, who in turn commissioned works for prominent court libraries outside of Florence, including for Ferdinand I of Naples, Louis XI of France, and Matthias Corvinus, king of Hungary. Francesco's work for Matthias Cornvinus was displayed in Biblioteca Corviniana, the first great humanist library that was not located in Italy. In 1456, Francesco created his first piece for the Petrarch manuscript which was documented in the guild Compagnia di San Paolo.

His productions for the Medici family began in 1457 when he illustrated the Exorcism of St Zeno in choir-books for Pistoia Cathedral commissioned by Bishop Donato Medici. He continued his employment by the Medici family when Piero de’ Medici commissioned him in 1458 to illustrate Pliny’s Natural History. He later illuminated Cosimo il Vecchio's choir-books of the Badia of Fiesole in 1461. In 1463, in collaboration with Zanobi Strozzi, he helped illuminate a choir-book for Cathedral of Florence, now in the Laurentian Library (Nos. 149, 150, 151). Strozzi was eleven years older than Francesco, but was also a pupil of Fra Angelico which is where the two artists met. Strozzi famously created the Madonna and Child with Four Angels today located in the Museum of San Marco in Florence. The collaboration with Francesco took eleven years and took the help of an entire workshop which included Cosimo Rosselli, Domenico Ghirlandaio, Attavante Attavanti and the Master of the Hamilton Xenophon. In Francesco's additions to Triumphs and Apollo and Daphne he used only drawings or tinted drawings. He also depicted a humanist working in his study while illustrating for Ptolemy and Pliny’s books which was the first of his time.

In 1475, Francesco illuminated a work for Ferdinando di Bologna. Ferdinando had been sent a copy of the Livio from Valencia (ms. 56 della Biblioteca Universitaria) of just plain text. Francesco was likely hired through Vespasiano da Bisticci, who handled most of Francesco's clients that were not located in Florence. Francesco illuminated the entire book for Ferdinando, utilizing his miniaturist skills. In the 15th century all books were sold just as text and did not include pictures. As a sign of wealth, the upperclass families would hire prominent illuminators to paint their books for them. In this way illuminators became popular and gained reputations based on the wealth of their clients.

When Francesco worked on illuminating works he focused on illustrating the different virtues and was said to be inspired by Botticelli. He believed that by illustrating them he would force readers to think about the specific traits they need to reach heaven. Through these virtues one could focus on their faith and gain salvation. The virtues most often depicted in his works were justice, prudence, temperance, and strength.

Francesco del Chierico worked on illustrating copies of Natural History by Pliny the Elder. The work is divided into 10 volumes and 37 books which cover everything the ancient Roman knew about natural sciences. Francesco illustrated Pliny twice in the books which are now located in Vienna and Naples. These author portraits of Pliny are especially of significance due to his attire. He chose to depict Pliny in his standard portrait face and dressed in typical fourteenth century clothing, to be specific the clothing of a professor.

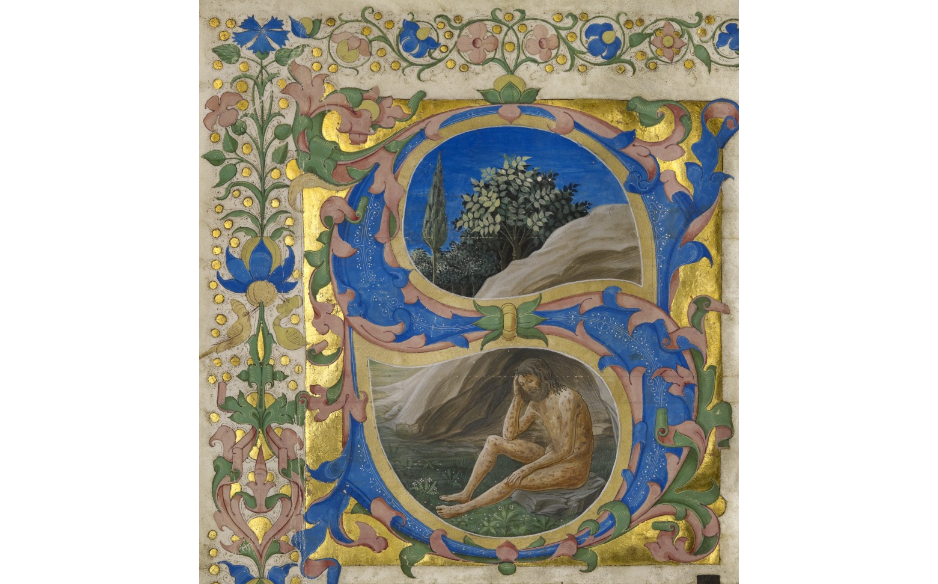
1450–1475 created in Florence, Italy. Tempera and gold on parchment.

== Disputationes Camaldulenses ==
There is still controversy today over the painters of many miniaturists' work. Luisa Vertova, a contributor to The Robert Lehman Collection, V. Italian 15th to 17th Century Drawings, and Annarosa Garzelli have contradicting opinions on who illustrated the portrait of Federico da Montefeltro in the copy of the Disputationes camaldulenses (Camaldolese Disputations) (Urb. lat. 508, Biblioteca Apostolica, Vaticana) by Cristoforo Landino. Francesco illuminated parts of the manuscript including an image of Landino and the Glory of Christ, yet there is speculation as to if he is the true artist to a portrait of two men.

On one particular page of the manuscript Francesco compares the spiritual to the secular. There are two paintings made in ovals on this page, the first depicting the author Cristoforo Landino, the second depicting Christ in glory. In this Christ is representing the spiritual, Landino the secular. There are other speculations that Francesco was trying to depict contemplation versus action with Christ as contemplation.

A miniature portrait of Federico da Montefeltro has him depicted on the left holding a book while looking at the man on the right, either the illuminator, Francesco, or the author, Cristoforo Landino. There is debate as to who the man on the right is due to little documentation or previous portraits of either Landino or Francesco. Vertova cites Francesco di Giorgio Martini as the artist, but mentions that sources differ on the painter, specifically mentioning Garzelli's book as having a different citation. Francesco di Giorgio Martini was of the same time period from Siena and was an accomplished architect, painter, sculptor, and military engineer. Although he was from Siena, Giorgio Martini had very Florentine qualities in his work which fueled the confusion between him and Di Antonio. His major paintings include the Coronation of the Virgin and A Women in a Stormy Landscape. There was also some lesser speculation that the work was by Francesco Roselli, a student of Di Antonio's. It is commonly accepted that Francesco did illuminate all the borders of the book. Further evidence that he created the double portrait is that the two men in it are standing behind what looks like a window. The window frames the two men and cuts them off at the waist with a rug hanging over the sill. This is the rug that was previously mentioned for having and identical pattern to that of Piero Pallaiuolo. It was common for Francesco to put architectural aspects, such as this one, into his works. Although there is controversy on the particular work, the majority of sources site Francesco di Antonio del Chierico as the artist.

Later in Francesco's life it is speculated that he was the master of Francesco Rosselli due to their stylistic similarities. Rosselli was a Florentine native and twelve years Chierico's junior. Although there is little written documentation of his primary training, Rosselli and Francesco worked at the same time in Florence and Rosselli developed an artistic style like that of Francesco's. Rosselli would go on to illustrate the most important maps of the world at the time including one of the first full maps of the world after Christopher Columbus's discovery of the Americas. He was also said to have a great influence on relatively unknown artists such as the Master of the Decads and Bartolomeo di Domenico di Guido and on more popular artists, Attavante and the Master of the Hamilton Xenophon.

Francesco is often cited as being one of the first artists to connect Naples to Florence. Many works help prove that ideas between artists were circulating from Naples to Florence and vice versa, often along with sketches. Francesco was clearly a key piece of this sharing of styles when, after illuminating the double portrait Ferdinando di Bologna the style of the double portrait, it began to show up all over Italy.
