= Hours of Henry VIII =

15th-century illuminated manuscript

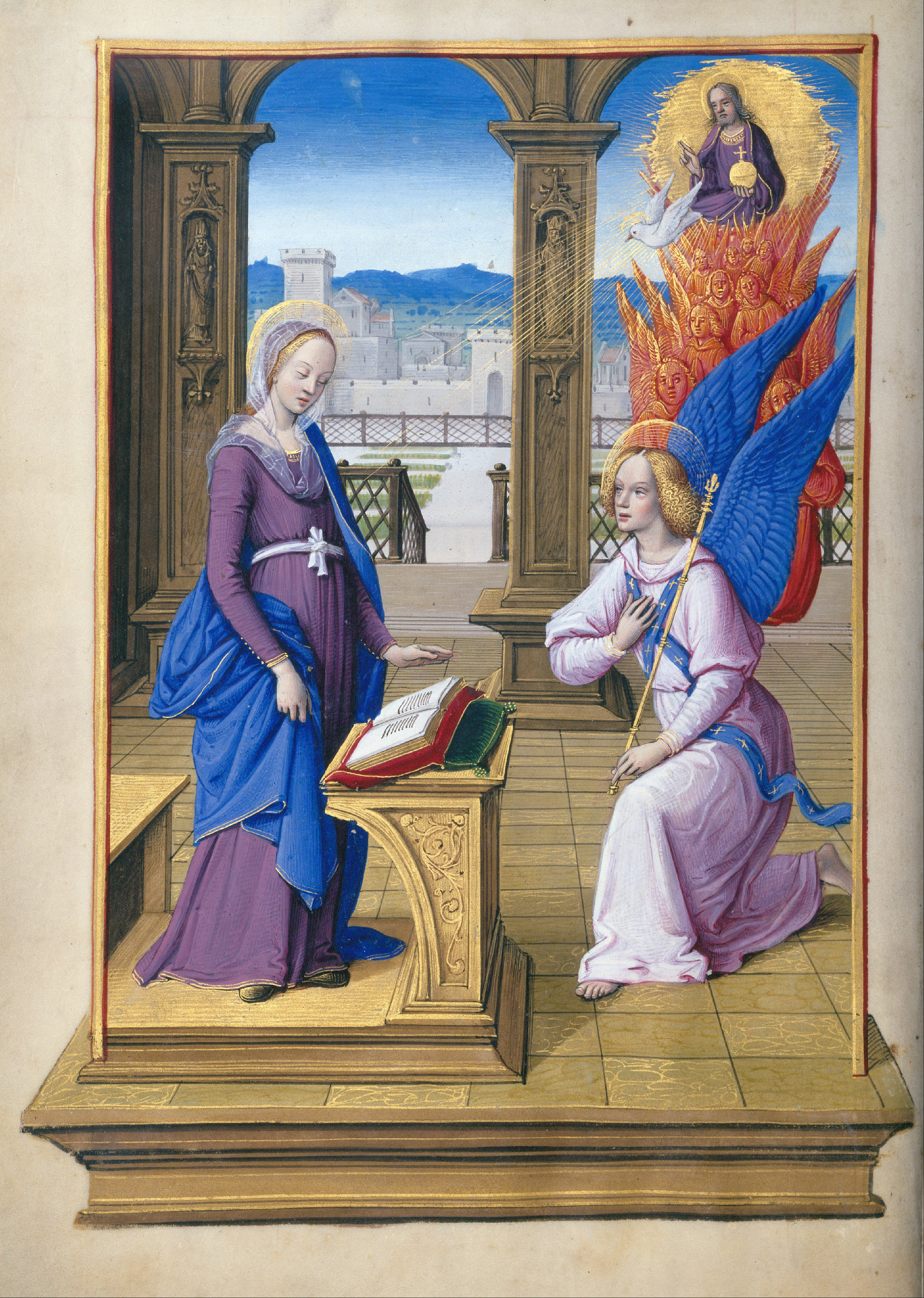
The Annunciation on f. 30v

The Hours of Henry VIII is a 15th-century illuminated book of hours, painted by Jean Poyet in Tours. Its 400 pages contain 55 full-page miniatures. It is housed under shelfmark MS H.8 in the Morgan Library & Museum, New York.

== History ==
The Hours of Henry VIII, one of Jean Poyer's best-known works, receives its name from "the possible but unproven eighteenth-century tradition" that it was once owned by King Henry VIII of England. The manuscript belonged to several later English kings including George III.

== The binding ==
The manuscript is bound in red velvet. Henry VIII's coat of arms, monogram and motto, "Honi soit qui mal y pense" are contained on the clasps.

On the manuscript's last blank leaf, there is a note supplied by George Wade (1673–1748), one of its owners:

In the Year 1723, being at Mons and hearing of This Book as the greatest Curiosity of its Kind, I found it in the hands of Mons[ieu]r Charle Benoit Desmanet, a Gentl[lema]n of that Town, (and after his Death procured it from his Executors) he Shew’d it me with great care and precaution not Suffering me to touch it, but tur’d over the leaves with a Small pair of Silver Tongues made for that purpose, And perceiving me to Smile at this Nicety, he said with some Warmth, Sir In this manner my Ancestors for above a hundred Years past have preserved this Book from blemish and in the Perfection you now see it; He told me likewise That the Tradition of the Family was That it was formerly A Present from the Emperor Charles the Fifth to Henry the Eighth King of England...

== Miniatures ==
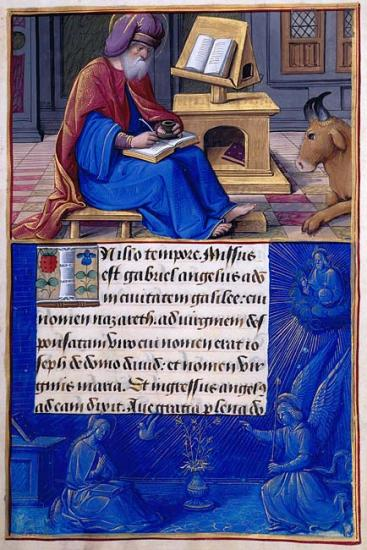
f.9 Luke's Lesson: Luke Writing; Border: Annunciation

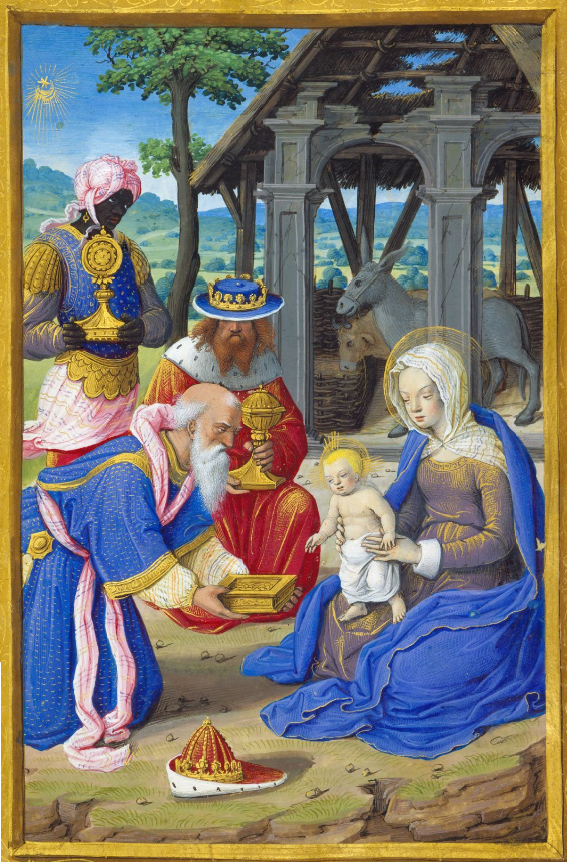
The Magi visiting the Christ-child

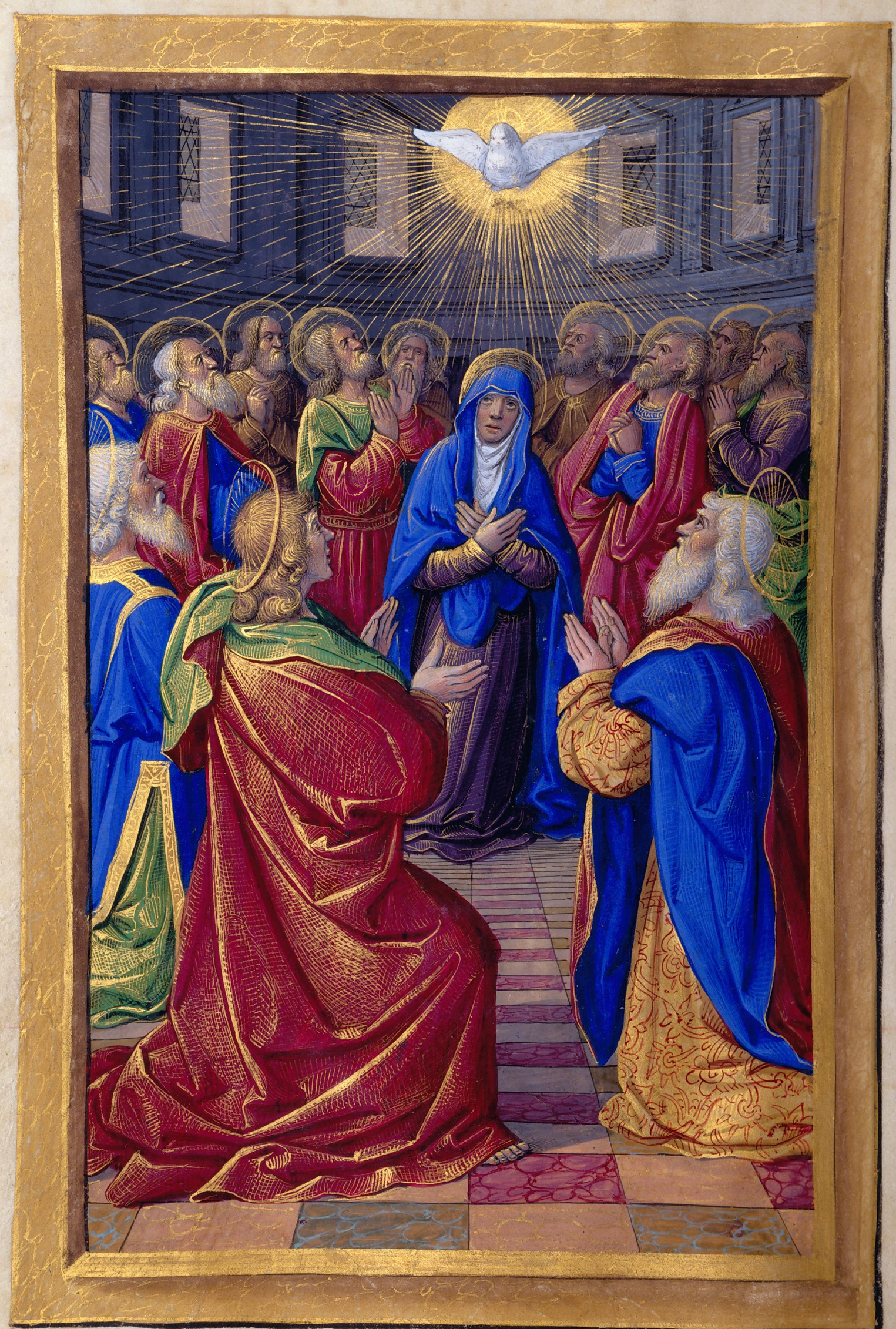
f.101v Hours of the Holy Spirit: Pentecost.
Depicting the descent of the Holy Spirit from Acts 2:1–4

== Sources ==
- Roger S. Wieck et al., The Hours of Henry VIII, George Braziller/The Morgan Library & Museum
- Morgan Library & Museum Hours of Henry VIII
- M. Moleiro Editor The Hours of Henry VIII
