= Gherardo di Giovanni del Fora =

Italian painter (1445-1497)

Gherardo di Giovanni di Miniato del Fora
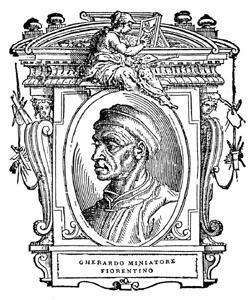
- Portrait from Vasari's "Vite"
- Born: 1445; Florence, Florentine Republic
- Died: 1497 (aged 51–52); Florence
- Other names: Gherardo di Giovanni, Master of the Triumph of Chastity
- Occupations: Painter and illuminator

Gherardo di Giovanni di Miniato del Fora (1445–1497) was an Italian painter and illuminator.

He was born in Florence as the son of the sculptor Giovanni di Miniato del Fora. He inherited his father's nickname of "Del Fora" in the history books. He is also known as "Master of the Triumph of Chastity". Besides paintings such as Christ and the Virgin Mary Interceding for Humanity, he is known for miniatures, mosaics, and jewelry. He had many commissions for members of the Medici family in Florence and also worked for King Matthias Corvinus in Hungary. His landscapes show the influence of Early Netherlandish painters.

He died in Florence.

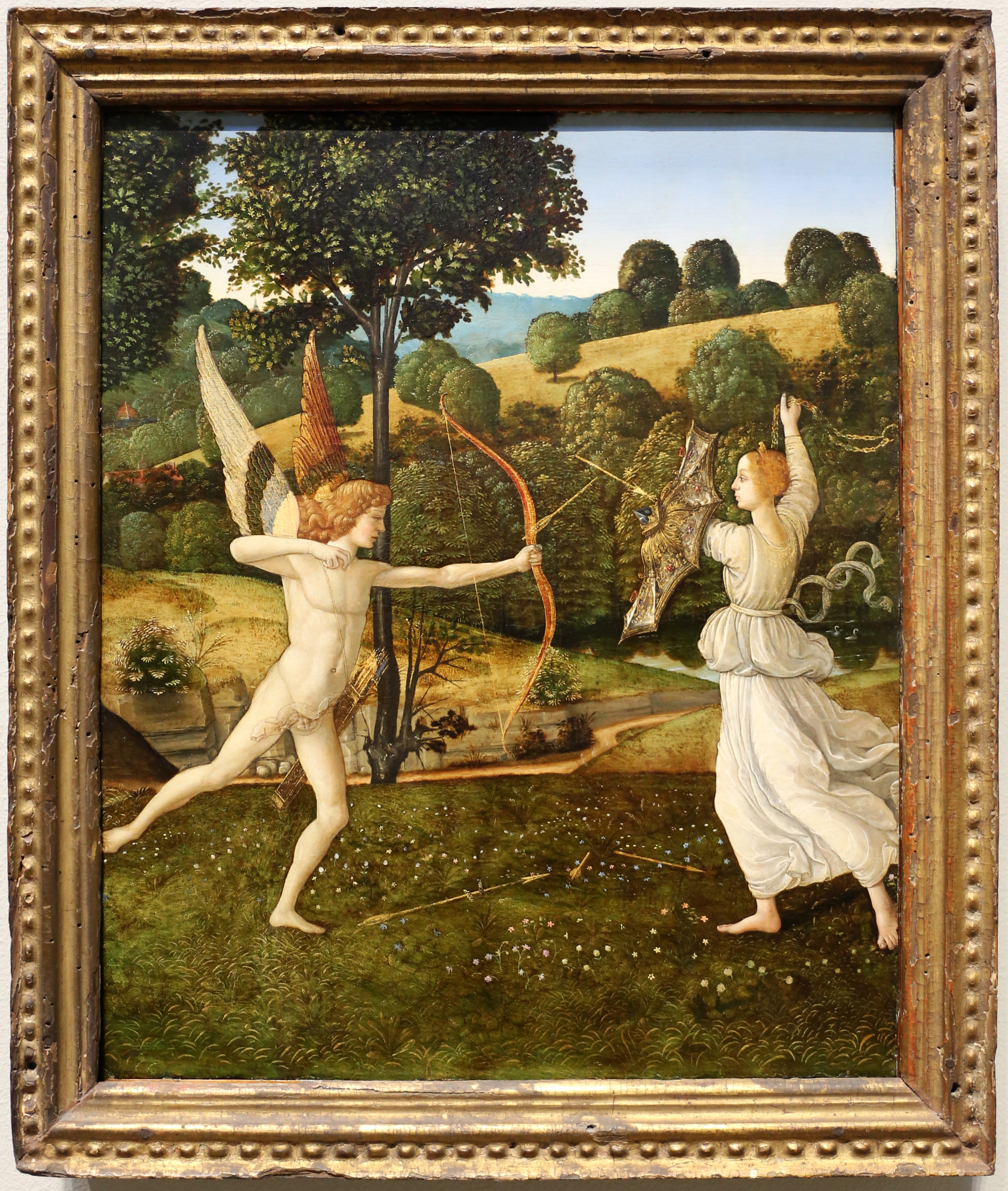
The Combat of Love and Chastity

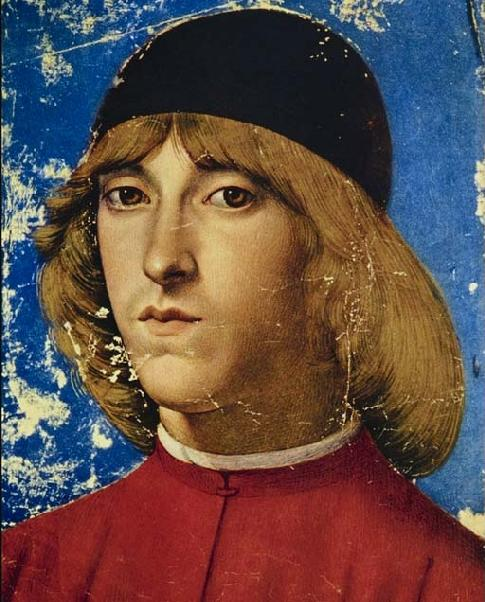
Portrait of Piero de Medici

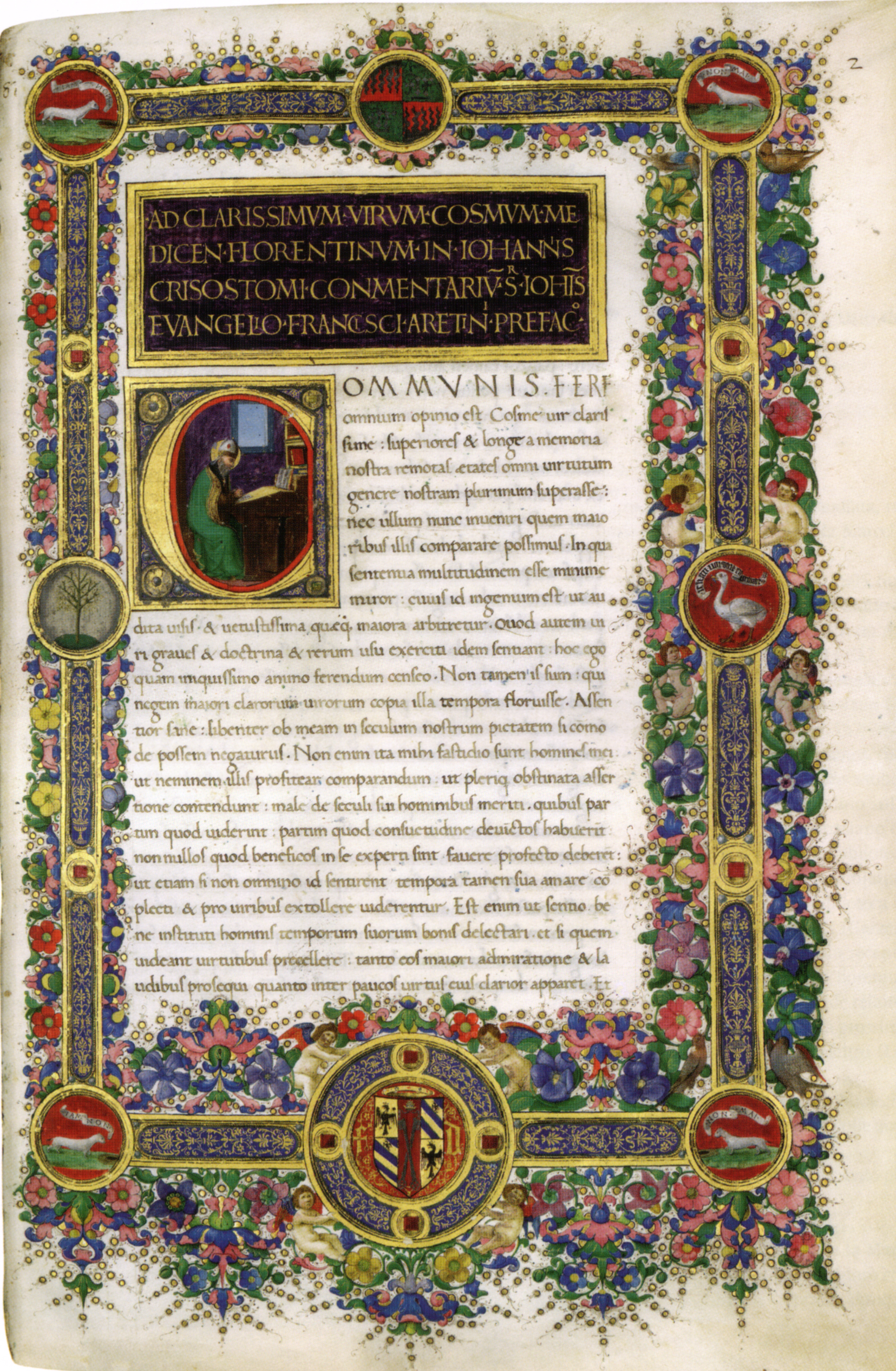
Illustrations from John Chrysostom's Homilies

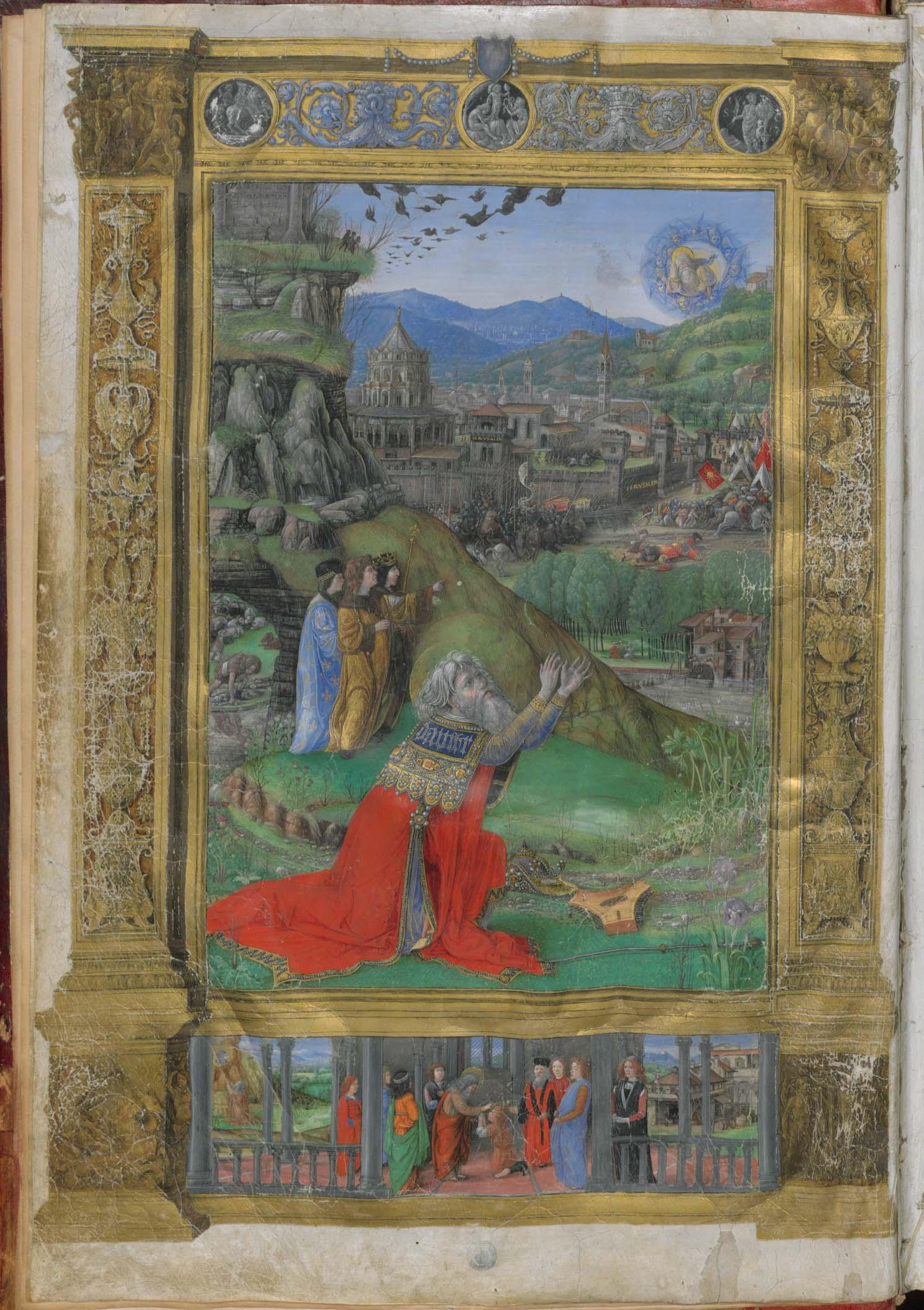
David in prayer, from the Bible of Matthias Corvinus
