= Jean Poyer =

French painter

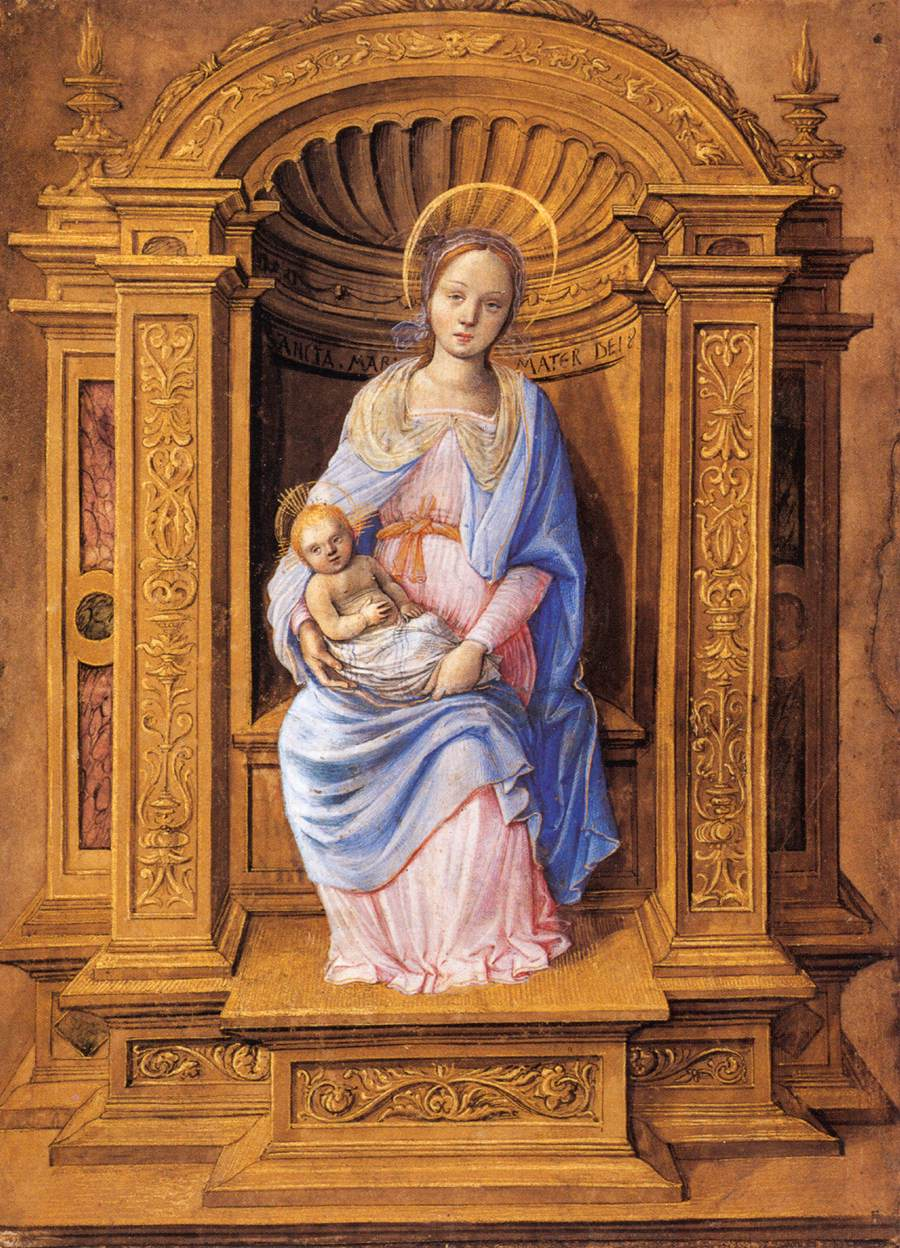
Virgin and Child (Louvre Museum)

Jean Poyer (alt: Poyet), was a French painter and manuscript illuminator of the late 15th century. As a multitalented artist – illuminator, painter, draftsman, and festival designer active from 1483 until his death – he was a painter of Renaissance France, working for the courts of three successive French kings: Louis XI, Charles VIII, and Louis XII.

== Biography ==
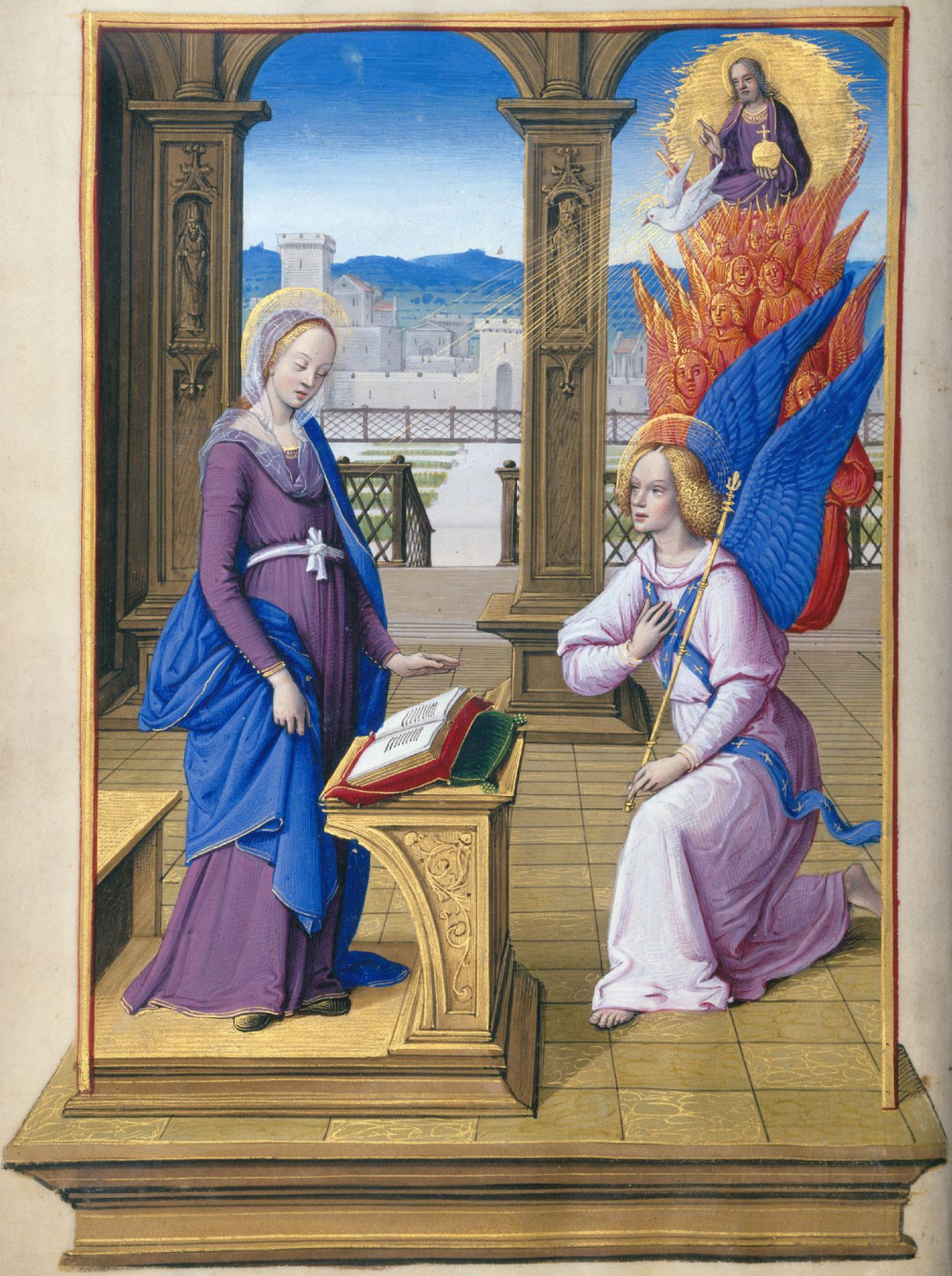
The Annunciation, from The Hours of Henry VIII, Pierpont Morgan Library, New York

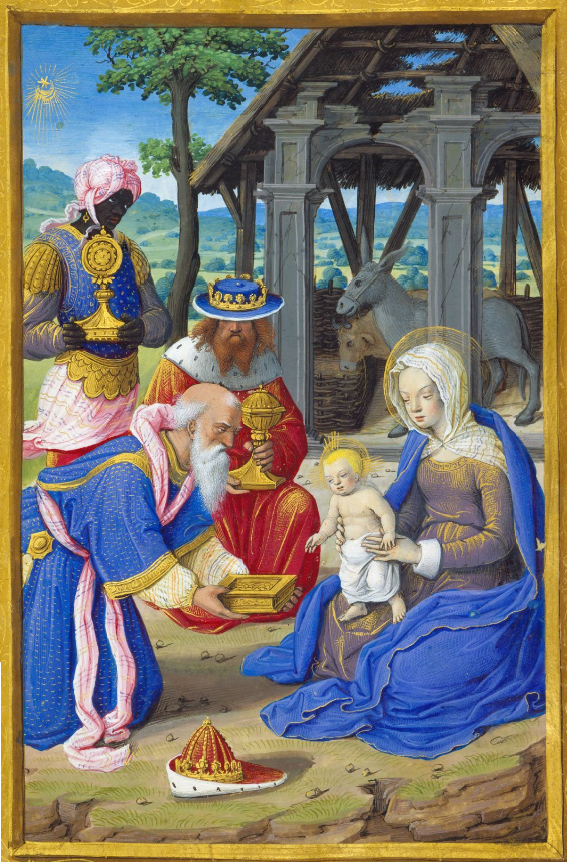
Magi visit the Christ child, from The Hours of Henry VIII, Pierpont Morgan Library, New York

Poyer was born in the mid-15th century. He was active between 1465 and 1503 in Tours, France.

Popular and well respected during his lifetime, in the 16th century he was compared to Jan van Eyck. Yet by the 17th century, he was all but forgotten, as were many painters and illuminators who did not often sign their work.

== Style ==
The work of his early period (in the 1480s) reveals Poyer's mastery of perspective, refined use of light and color, and realistic human depictions, with influences of the Renaissance, a discernible break from the Late Gothic style which often included unrealistic figures in dollhouse like compartments. Poyer's style, though quite different, evolved from that of the previous generation. Painters in Tours in the 1460s and 1470s had certain stylistic graces – such as their partiality for hues of lilac and plum. Poyer traveled to northern Italy and became motivated by the works of artists such as Andrea Mantegna and Giovanni Bellini, as well as being influenced by the presence in Tours of Jean Fouquet who introduced Italian styling to the area.

During Poyer's mature period (from the 1490s until his death ca. 1503), he produced his most impressive creations. His work began to show a lighter, more pastel palette, with finer brushstrokes, as can be seen in the Prayer Book. His work, however, was ever-changing, and many of the larger manuscripts retained aspects of his earlier, more monumental manner, apparent in the Hours of Henry VIII and the Lallemant Missal.

== Professional life ==
Poyer did not work alone, like many major artists of the late Middle Ages and Renaissance periods he managed a workshop. As there are relatively few manuscripts produced by his workshop, it is believed he only had a few assistants, talented illuminators capable of emulating his subtle style. Even today, it is difficult to distinguish between Poyer's hand and his assistant's. To make such distinctions more difficult, some illuminations were entirely by his assistants, while in other, Poyer would paint a portion of a miniature and then his helpers would complete the work.

There were few artists of his caliber that he competed with professionally. The Master of Jacques de Besançon worked for some of the same clients (such as King Charles VIII), but his broad style lacked Poyer's subtlety. A more direct competitor, Jean Bourdichon also lived and worked in Tours, using a similar style and in the same time period, and often for the same clientele as Poyer.

== Legacy ==
Although the year of Poyer's death is uncertain, it is believed to be between 1498 and 1503. In a poem written in 1503, Jean Lemaire the Belges compared Poyet to Jean Fouquet, Simon Marmion, Rogier van der Weyden, Jan van Eyck and Hugo van der Goes, placing Jean Poyet between other deceased painters, which he compared to living artists. One can therefore assume that Jean Poyet was deceased by no later than 1503.

When Poyer died, his workshop collapsed and his (some would say less talented) rival in Tours, Jean Bourdichon, expanded his influence by increasing the production of his many assistants. Some shop members, as well as other painters who refused to join Bourdichon's factory, moved to Paris, and continued to illuminate in "pseudo-Poyer" style, however, not with the same level of talent as Poyer. The Hours of Jean Lallemant the Elder is an example of work in this "pseudo-Poyer" style.

The influence of Poyer's subtle style was not extensive, and only one painter, the Master of Claude de France, should be considered his true artistic heir.

== Works ==
His most noted works include the Prayer Book of Anne de Bretagne and the Briçonnet Book of Hours.

Poyer's extensive list of work includes the following:

=== Paintings ===
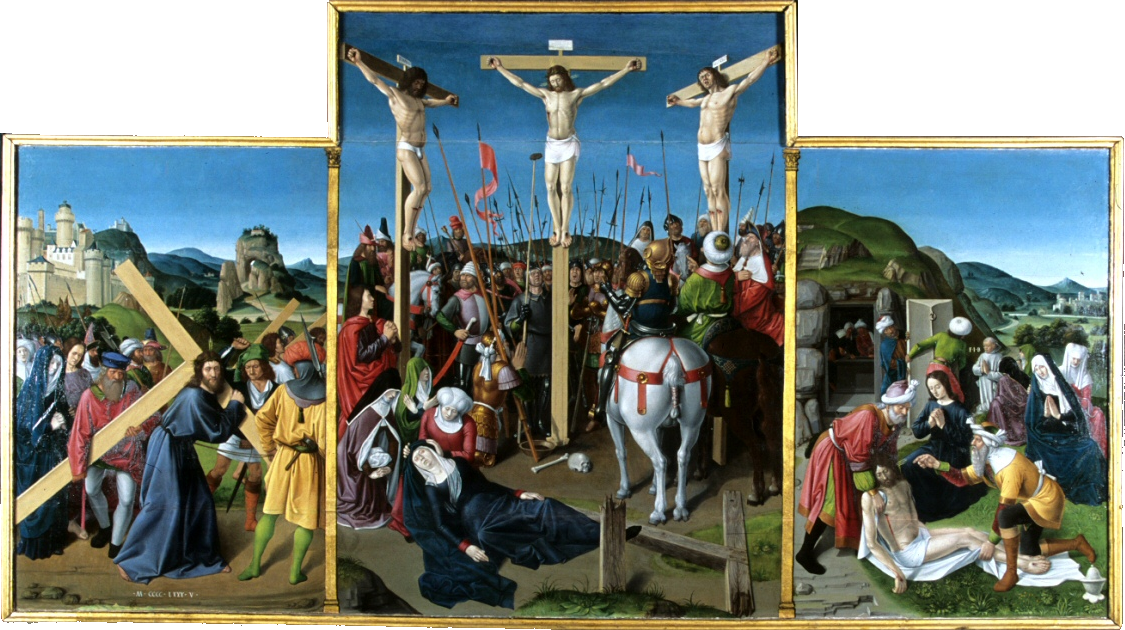
Altarpiece of the Crucifixion, église Saint-Antoine de Loches

- Altarpiece of the Crucifixion, oil on panel, 1485, 143 x 262 cm, église Saint-Antoine, Loches, commissioned by Jean Béraud, from the Chartreuse du Liget then the Château de Loches.
- Triptych of the Life of Mary Magdalene, oil on panel, c. 1500–1502 or 1515, église Notre-Dame-de-l'Assomption Censeau, commissioned by John IV of Chalon-Arlay in Tours or Paris and possibly achieved by a follower
  - Sermon of Christ, oil on panel transposed on canvas, 120 × 92 cm.
  - Supper in the House of Simon the Pharisee, oil on panel, 122 × 207 cm.
  - Noli me tangere or The Apparition of Christ to Mary Magdalene, oil on panel transposed on canvas, 120 × 92 cm.

==== Additional works ====
- Painting of Vespers: Massacre of the Innocents.
- Painting of Flight Into Egypt.
- Painting 1,031 coats of arms to be attached to the candles and torches used at the funeral of Louis XI's Queen Charlotte of Savoy.

=== Manuscripts ===
==== Prayer Book of Anne de Bretagne ====
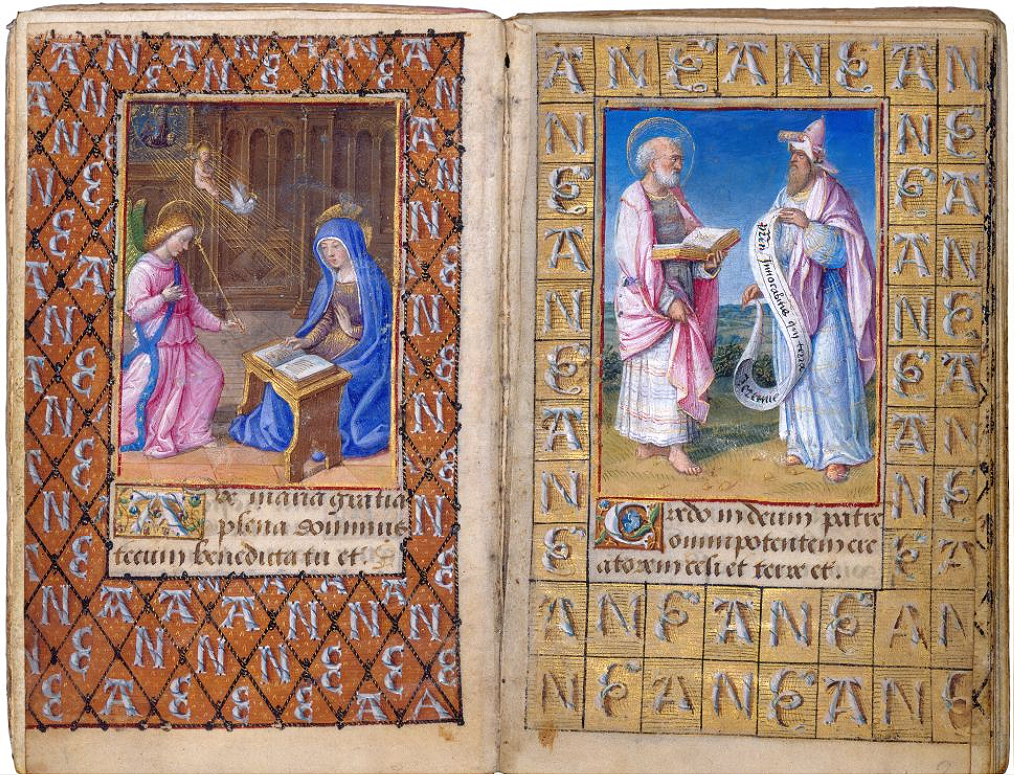
Folios 1v-2 from Prayer Book of Anne de Bretagne. Illuminations depict 'the Annunciation', and 'The Apostle Peter and the Prophet Jeremiah'.

Anne de Bretagne, also known as Anne of Brittany, wife of two successive kings of France, Charles VIII and Louis XII, commissioned Poyer to make a Prayer book to teach her son, Charles-Orland (1492–1495), his catechism. This richly illustrated book includes thirty four miniatures, which are among the most delicate examples of art from the late 15th century. The book was painted in Tours by Poyer.

The Prayer Book of Anne de Bretagne is in the collections of the Morgan Library and Museum of New York.

==== Briçonnet Book of Hours ====
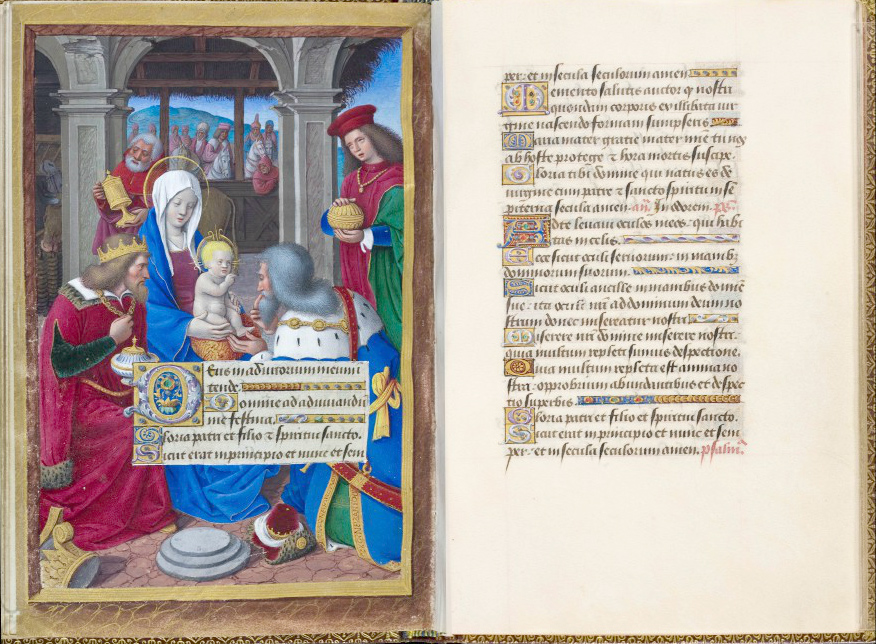
Page 49 from Briçonnet Heures

The Briçonnet Book of Hours ("Briconnet Heures") was commissioned by Guillaume Briçonnet, France's secretary of the treasury under Charles VIII, as a gift to his wife. It is estimated to have been painted between 1485 and 1490. Differing from typical style of the era, some of the miniatures in this book feature an atypical depiction of Mary, wearing her hair rolled up in a bun under her veil, indicating that Mary may have been modeled to look like Guillaume's wife.

The Briçonnet Book of Hours is collections of the Teylers Museum in Haarlem, Netherlands.

==== The Hours of Henry VIII ====
Illuminated sometime around 1500AD by Poyer, the Hours of Henry VIII is a manuscript believed to have been owned by King Henry VIII, however, this association remains unproven. The manuscript is bound in red velvet and has clasps continuing Henry VIII's coat of arms.

==== Lallemant Missal ====
The Lallemant Missal is a prayer and devotional book in the style of an illuminated manuscript, featuring feasts and litanies. It was made for a member of the Lallemant family of Bourges, likely for Guillaume Lallemant, whose coat of arms is found in the margins on several pages.

Reflectography and band pass filters have been applied to this work, revealing detailed under-drawings beneath the miniatures, giving clues as to how the work was constructed.

This manuscript is in the collection of the Morgan Library and Museum of New York. It contains five large miniatures, one historiated initial, and borders drawn by Poyet, and 18 small miniatures illuminated by Master of Spencer 6. The date of this work is estimated to be between 1500 and 1503.

==== Additional works ====
- Illuminating the "Tilliot Hours."
- Painting a schoolbook, a treatise on the Apostles' Creed, and his portrait for Charles VIII.
- Drawing of The Mocking of Elisha, Art Institute of Chicago.
- Designed and supervised elaborate theatrical spectacles for Charles VIII of France and Anne of Brittany's ceremonial entry into Tours following their marriage (of 6 December 1491).
- Managing the pageants at Tours for the new King Louis XII (whose reign started on 7 April 1498).

== Exhibitions ==
The Morgan Library & Museum, of New York City, featured an exhibition highlighting Poyer's works entitled Jean Poyer: Artist to the Court of Renaissance France from 25 January through 6 May 2001. This was the first US exhibition devoted exclusively to Poyer. In addition to manuscripts owned by the museum, The Teylers Museum of Haarlem, Netherlands loaned the museum the Briçonnet Book of Hours for the exhibit.

The Prayer Book of Anne de Bretagne was included in the exhibit "Medieval Monsters: Terrors, Aliens, Wonders" at The Morgan Library & Museum, June 8 through Sept. 23, 2018, where it was turned to the page featuring St. Margaret the Virgin and the dragon.

== Sources ==
- Taburet-Delahaye, Elisabeth; Bresc-Bautier, Geneviève; Crépin-Leblond, Thierry (2010). France 1500 : Entre Moyen Age et Renaissance – Catalogue de l'exposition du Grand Palais à Paris, 6 octobre 2010-10 janvier 2011 (in French). Paris: Réunion des Musées nationaux. ISBN 978-2-7118-5699-2.
