= Francesco Rosselli =

Italian painter (1445 – before 1513)

- Born: 1448
- Died: 1518 (aged 69–70)
- Occupation: artist

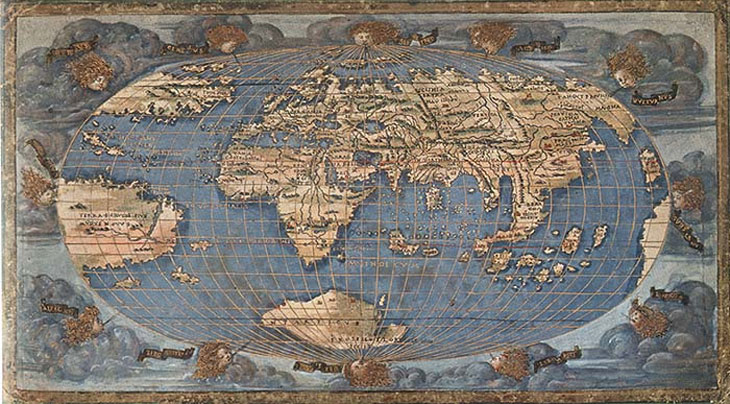
World Map oval by Francesco Rosselli, copper plate engraving on vellum, National Maritime Museum, 1508

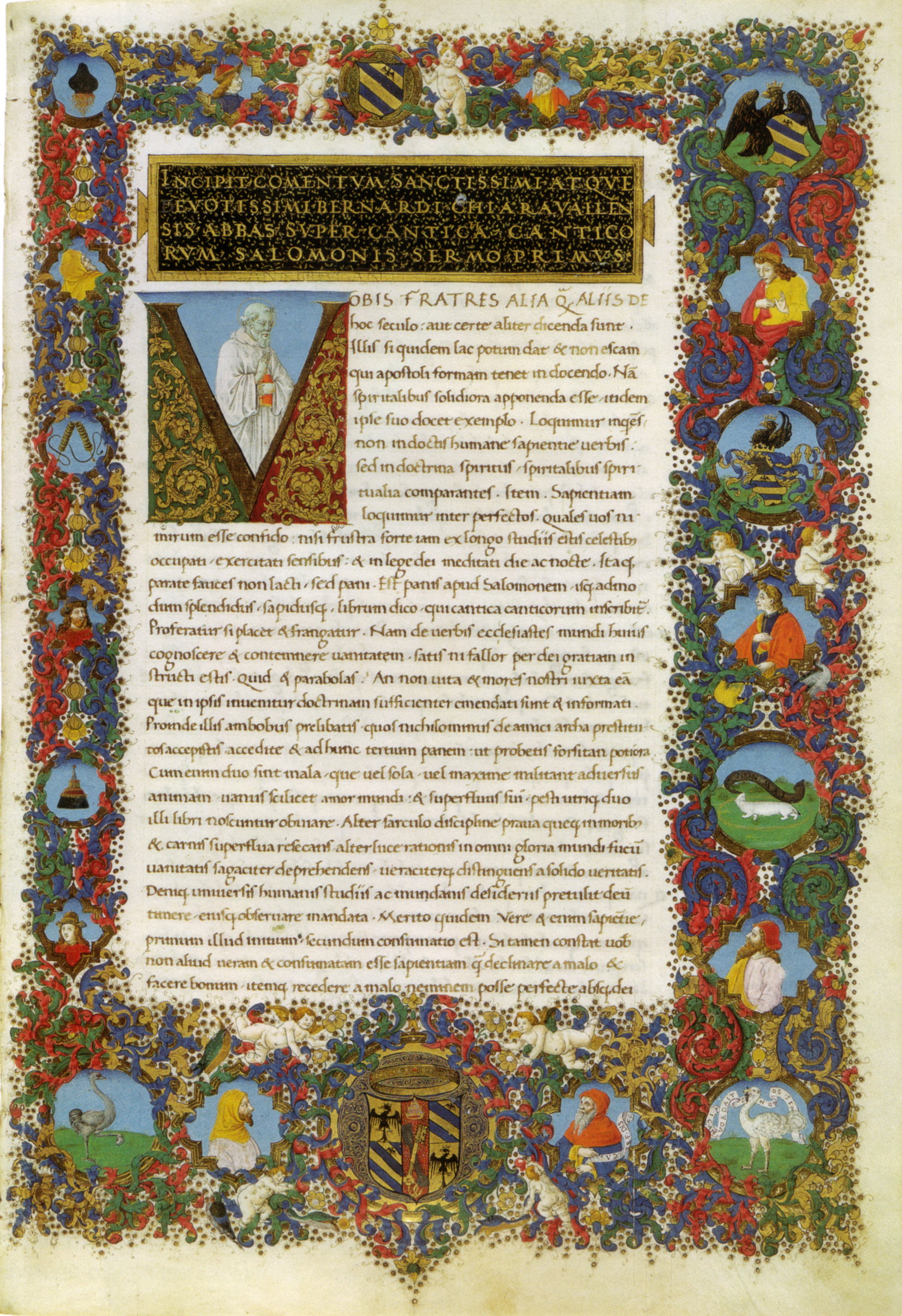
From an illuminated manuscript by Francesco Rosselli, Vatican Library

Francesco Rosselli (1445 – before 1513) was an Italian miniature painter, and engraver of maps and old master prints. He was described as a cartographer, although his contribution did not include any primary research and was probably limited to engraving, decorating and selling manuscript maps created by others. He created many maps, including one of the first printed maps of the world to incorporate the discoveries of Christopher Columbus in the Americas. The attribution of prints to him is the subject of debate, as different engraving styles are used. This may be the result of different artists in his workshop, or of his and his shop's ability to use different styles.

== Life ==
Rosselli was born in Florence. He painted miniatures in manuscripts produced in 15th-century Florence, including copies of Ptolemy's Geographia and liturgical works for the city's cathedral. The so-called Tavola Strozzi, a view of the Bay of Naples depicting the return of the Aragonese fleet after the Battle of Ischia, has sometimes been attributed to his hand. Rosselli's pictorial engravings were heavily influenced by the paintings of his fellow Florentine Sandro Botticelli. Among his best-known works is a series of fifteen engravings of the Life of the Virgin and Christ.

In the 1480s, Rosselli left his wife and children with his half-brother Cosimo and left Florence for Hungary, because of debt according to his brother, where he made maps for Matthias Corvinus, king of Hungary. Upon returning to Florence, he started a shop to sell his engravings. Rosselli may have been the engraver for some of the "new" maps in editions of Ptolemy's Geographia published in Florence in 1480–82. He was also recorded in Venice in 1505 and 1508. His shop also sold maps, and was the first known shop to market maps commercially. His two most famous maps date from 1506 and 1508. The 1506 Contarini-Rosselli map, his only signed and dated work, was the first printed map showing the New World. Rosselli's 1508 world map was the first map drawn on an oval projection. This map may have been sold in his shop.

== See also ==
- Bible of Federico da Montefeltro
