= Girolamo da Cremona =

Italian painter

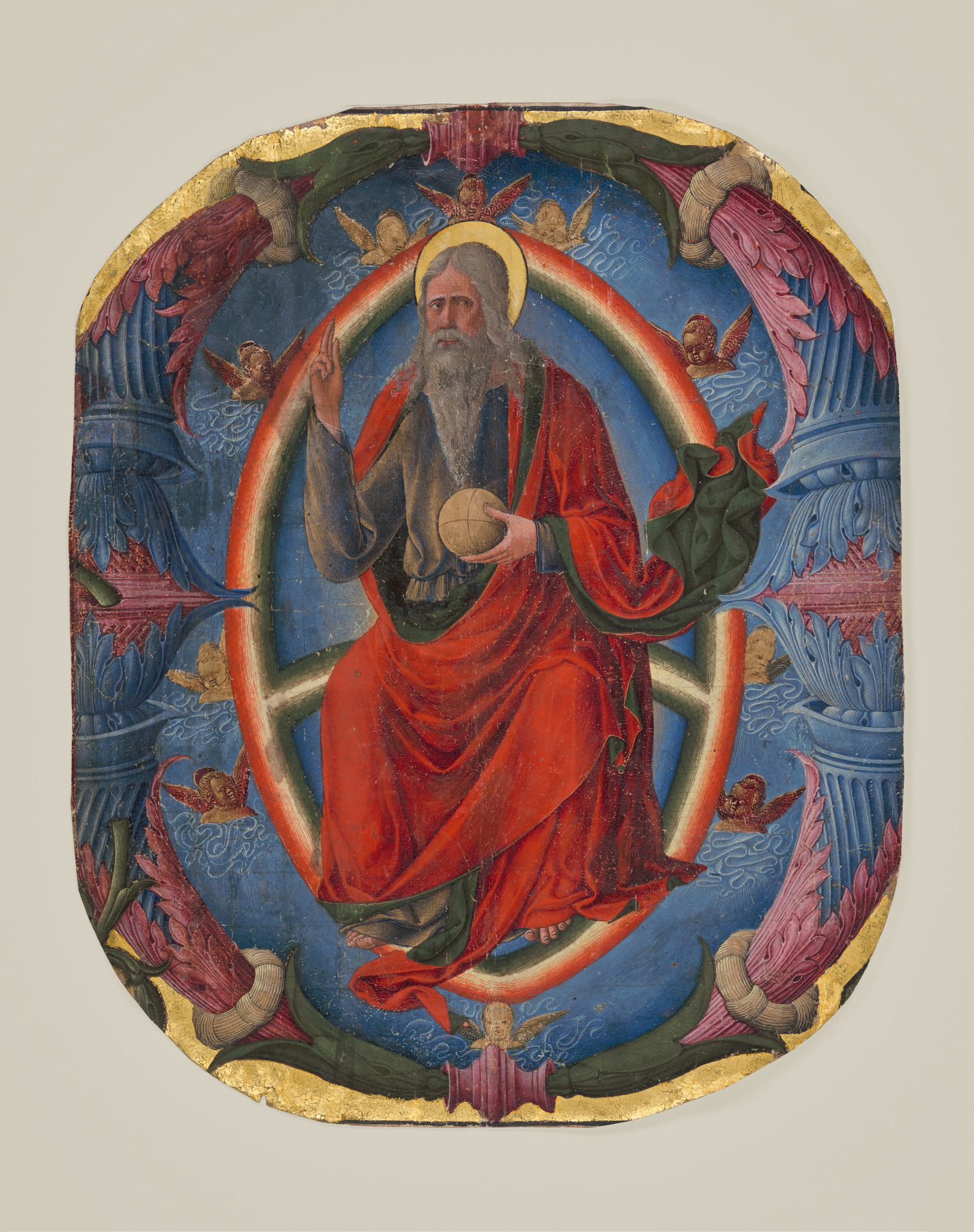
God the Father, piece from an antiphonary by Girolamo da Cremona

Girolamo da Cremona, also known as Girolamo de' Corradi (fl. 1451–1483) and Zanino de Cremona, was an Italian Renaissance painter, illuminator, and miniaturist of manuscripts and early printed books. He was influenced and furthered by Andrea Mantegna.

He was active in northern Italy, in Ferrara and Mantua in the 1450s to 1460s, later in Siena and Florence, and finally in Venice.
