= Vespasiano da Bisticci =

Italian humanist and librarian (1421–1498)

Figure believed to be Bisticci from the Commentario della vita di messer Giannozzo Manetti

Vespasiano da Bisticci (1421/1422 – 1498) was an Italian humanist and bookseller of the early Renaissance period.

== Early life ==
Vespasiano was born in 1421 or 1422 near Rignano sull'Arno, not far from Florence. His father was in the wool trade. His father died in 1426, leaving considerable debt. His widow and their six children fell on hard times, and in 1433 Vespaciano left school to work in Florence at a book shop.

== Bookseller ==
He was hired by a book merchant, or cartolaio, Michele Guarducci, in 1434. The shop bound and sold books, as well as writing materials such as paper and ink. This work brought him in contact with erudite Florentines, and he transitioned from a kind of manual laborer into a well-regarded procurer of rare texts. When desired texts were obtained, he engaged scribes to make copies for his customer.

== Creation of libraries ==
While he was chiefly a book merchant, or cartolaio, he had a role in the formation of many great libraries of the time. When Cosimo de' Medici wished to assemble the Laurentian Library of Florence, Vespasiano advised him, and sent him by Tommaso Parentucelli (later Pope Nicholas V) a systematic catalogue, which became the plan of the new collection. In twenty-two months Vespasiano had 200 volumes made for Cosimo by twenty-five copyists. Most of them were, as typical of the era, books of theology and liturgical chant.

He was an important factor in the diffusion of classical authors when Nicholas V, the true founder of the Vatican Library, became pope. He devoted fourteen years to collecting the library of Federico da Montefeltro, the Duke of Urbino, organizing it in a modern manner. It contained the catalogues of the Vatican, of San Marco, Florence, of the Visconti Library at Pavia, and Oxford.

== Lives of Illustrious Men ==
Vespasiano wrote a collection of biographies that is a major source of information for the history of 15th-century humanism: Vite di uomini illustri del secolo XV, published in English as Vespasiano memoirs, lives of illustrious men of the xvth century.

These writings remained unknown until the manuscripts were discovered by Cardinal Angelo Mai in the Vatican Library. Mai published them in 1839. Mai's edition in 1847 inspired Jacob Burckhardt to begin his Civilization of the Renaissance in Italy (1860).

== Later life ==
He retired in 1478, when the printing press overtook the previous trade in manuscripts.

He never married and died in 1498 at the age of 77.
