= Stephan Jakob Neher =

Stephan Jakob Neher (24 July 1829 – 7 October 1902) was a German Catholic priest and church historian.

== Life ==
His family were country people of Ebnat, where he was born, which became a part of Aalen) in Württemberg. After the gymnasium school Neher devoted himself to the study of theology in the University of Tübingen. After ordination, he worked as pastor of Dorfmerkingen, then of Tübingen, and finally of Nordhausen (in the district of Ellwangen, Württemberg). In addition, Neher devoted himself throughout his life to intellectual pursuits, principally to canon law and church history, giving his attention, in the latter study, chiefly to ecclesiastical geography and statistics.

Neher died in Nordhausen.

== Works ==
In his first major work, which appeared in 1861, Neher dealt with the topic of the privileged altar (altare privilegiatum). In 1864 he published the first volume of his trilogy Kirchliche Geographie und Statistik (Ratisbon, 1864–68). It was, for that day, an important work for historians, a systematic collection of geographical data. His book on the celebration of two Masses by a priest on the same day in canon law was entitled Die Bination nach ihrer geschichtlichen Entwicklung und nach dem heutigen Recht (Ratisbon, 1874). After 1878 Neher edited the statistical "Personalkatalog" of his own diocese of Rottenburg am Neckar, and was one of the principal contributors to the second edition of Wetzer und Welte's Kirchenlexicon. For this work he wrote 235 articles, or greater parts of articles. Their content is mainly matter relating to church history, or to ecclesiastical statistics.
