= Votive Mass =

Mass offered for a special intention

In the liturgy of the Catholic Church, a votive Mass (Latin missa votiva) is a Mass offered for a votum, a special intention. Such a Mass does not correspond to the Divine Office for the day on which it is celebrated. Every day in the year has appointed to it a series of canonical hours and (except Good Friday) a Mass corresponding, containing, for instance, the same collect and the same Gospel. On most days, the Mass will correspond to the Office, but on occasion, other Masses may be celebrated. Votive Masses appear in the Roman and Gallican Rites. The Suffrage Mass is a type of votive Mass that is celebrated in favour to some dead people. Peter Mogila introduced votive liturgies in his Sluzhebnik (1639) inspired by Roman Missal.

== History ==
The principle of the votive Mass is older than its name. Almost at the very origin of the Western liturgies (with their principle of change according to the Calendar) Mass was occasionally offered, apparently with special prayers and lessons, for some particular intention, irrespective of the normal Office of the day. Among the miracles quoted by Augustine of Hippo in his seminal "De civitate Dei contra paganos", XXII, 8, is the story of one Hesperius cured of an evil spirit by a private Mass said in his house with special prayers for him—essentially, a votive Mass for his cure.

The first sacramentaries contain many examples of what would now be called votive Masses. So the Leonine book has Masses "in natale episcoporum" (ed. Feltoe, pp. 123–26), "de siccitate temporis" (ed. Feltoe, 142), "contra impetitores" (ed. Feltoe, 27), and so on throughout. Indeed, the Masses for ordination and for the dead, which occur in this book and throughout the Roman Rite and Gallican Rite, are examples of votive Masses for all kinds of occasions, for ordinations (ed. Wilson, pp. 22–30, etc.), for those about to be baptized (ed. Wilson 34), anniversaries of ordinations (153–54), nuns (156), for the sick (282), for marriages (265), kings (276), travellers (283), the dead (301 sq.), and a large collection of Masses of general character to be said on any Sunday (224–44). In this book the name first occurs, "Missa votiva in sanctorum commemoratione" (p. 367; Rheinau and S. Gallen MSS.). The Gregorian Sacramentary, too, has a large collection of such Masses and the name "Missa votiva" (e.g., Patrologia Latina, LXXVIII, 256).

Throughout the Middle Ages the votive Mass was a regular institution. The principle came to be that, whereas one official (capitular) high Mass was said corresponding to the Office, a priest who said a private Mass for a special intention said a votive Mass corresponding to his intention. The great number of forms provided in medieval Missals furnished one for any possible intention. Indeed, it seems that at one time a priest normally said a votive Mass whenever he celebrated. John Beleth in the thirteenth century describes a series of votive Masses once said (fuit quoddam tempus) each day in the week: on Sunday, of the Holy Trinity; Monday, for charity; Tuesday, for wisdom; Wednesday, of the Holy Ghost; Thursday, of the Angels; Friday, of the Cross; Saturday, of the Blessed Virgin (Explic. div. offic., 51). This completely ignores the ecclesiastical year.

But there was a general sentiment that, at least on the chief feasts, even private Masses should conform to the Office of the day. The Feast of the Holy Trinity began as a votive Mass to be said on any Sunday after Pentecost, when there was no feast.

== Suffrage Mass ==
The Suffrage Mass is a particular type of Votive Mass in which one or more Catholic baptized believers ask the celebrating priest to offer a Mass to God in favour of the salvation of one or more souls temporarily living in Purgatory. While the Holy Mass is always only offered to God, it can also be dedicated to one or more Catholic saint in order to ask their intercessory prayer to God.

The Council of Trent stated the belief in the intercession of saints as a canon every Catholic is obliged to believe:

Canon v. If any one shall say, that it is an imposture to celebrate masses in honour of the saints, and for obtaining their intercession with God, as the Church intends; let him be anathema.

— Canons and Decrees of the Council of Trent/Session XXII/Sacrifice of the Mass

For the Catholic doctrine, any saint may pray God to intercede with his divine grace in favour of any living human soul, but within a hierarchical order of intercessory power: first Jesus Christ, by way of Mass (worship), secondly the Blessed Virgin Mary (hyperdulia), the other saints, and lastly, the hierarchy of angels.

The pious practice of the Suffrage Mass is also founded on the belief in the existence of Purgatory. For the Catholic faith, at the time of death there is a separation of the soul form the earthly body. The soul endures the particular judgment of God who is Omniscient and therefore cannot fail in his judgement. The judgement is based on the balance of personal sins to merits toward salvation acquired during the earthly life of the individual soul. The soul cannot do anything to improve its afterlife condition after death. There are three possible judgements of God on destination for the soul upon death of the body: Paradise, Purgatory and Hell.

Only souls who die in sanctity, which is to say with no stain of personal or original sin, are admitted to Paradise immediately after their particular judgements. Otherwise, if they have died with unrepented venial but not mortal sin on their soul which thus still needs purification, the soul must first enter Purgatory before entering Paradise to ensure nothing impure with sin comes into God's presence. (Accumulated) unrepented and therefore unshriven (unforgiven) sin that is not just venial but mortal, for which no expiation is possible to be made (due to the body's death,) leads to Hell, the tormented condition of being in which at minimum there is eternal separation from God with no possibility of becoming close. ("Spem Omnem Derelinquas, Anima" ["Abandon All Hope, Soul"] are traditionally the four words that mark the entrance gate to Hell.)

The soul is believed to stay in Purgatory for a finite period of time in order to repair its sins and have them forgiven by God. The expiation must satisfy God's infinite justice before the soul can be admitted to Paradise. The number of months or years in Purgatory is believed to be proportional to the gravity of the sins committed during the earthly journey.

The Suffrage Mass is believed to have the power to shorten the expiation sentence if God in infinite justice deigns to exercise mercy and grant the grace of a lesser penalty to the soul for whom the Mass is offered by surviving relatives and other benefactors. The prayer of saints to God can also contribute to reach the same conclusion.

When the expiation sentence has satisfied God's justice, St Michael the Archangel is believed to be deployed to Purgatory to liberate these expiated souls and bring them to Paradise. Paradise is dedicated to the vision of the truth and contemplation of the Face of God, which is the highest and last purpose of the human soul. In Paradise a hierarchy of angels and souls pray to and worship God, and live forever in the communion while waiting for the expiating souls remaining in Purgatory to be definitely saved and be rewarded with resurrected flesh in the General Judgement at the end of (earthly) time.

== Rulings ==
=== Ordinary Form ===
The General Instruction of the Roman Missal (GIRM) allows for the celebration of votive masses on certain days. The GIRM states that these days are weekdays of Ordinary Time, including days on which there is an optional memorial. However, the GIRM allows for votive masses to be celebrated on weekdays of Advent (up to and including 16 December, but not after), weekdays within Eastertide (excluding the octave), weekdays of Christmas before 2 January, or on obligatory memorials in cases in which the celebrant considers it to be of pastoral benefit to the people. Votive Masses are also allowed on Sundays of Ordinary Time with the permission or direction of the Diocesan Bishop or Ordinary.

in the revision of the Roman Missal and Lectionary, votive Masses were split into four:

- Votive Masses are Masses celebrating the mysteries of the Lord (such as the Eucharist or Holy Cross), of Mary (such as Mary, Queen of the Apostles, and the Immaculate Conception), of any given Saint, of an Apostle, of the Holy Angels, or of all saints. Importantly, votive Masses cannot be about events in the life of Jesus or Mary (with the exception of the Immaculate Conception), as those form an integral part of the Church's liturgical year.
- Ritual Masses are masses celebrated for a sacrament or sacramental. They may be celebrated on weekdays and Sundays of Ordinary Time, weekdays of Lent (excluding Ash Wednesday and Holy Week), weekdays of Easter (outside the Octave), and weekdays of Advent and Christmas. Sacraments can be celebrated without a ritual Mass on days in which ritual Masses are forbidden, (e.g. solemnities) such as Baptisms on Easter Sunday or Confirmations at Pentecost. In these cases, the mass of the day with its readings and propers are used.
- Masses for Various Needs and Occasions are Masses for the needs of the Church (e.g. the laity or ministers), for public needs (e.g. During a war or for national leaders), for public occasions (e.g. a harvest), or for various needs (e.g. reconciliation). These Masses can take place on the same days as votive Masses.
- Masses for the Dead are Masses that pray for the repose of the souls of a particular person or for all the dead. Funeral Masses are the primary Mass for the Dead, and may take place on any day that is not a Holy Day of Obligation or a Sunday of Easter, Advent, or Lent. Masses said upon receiving news of a death, for the final burial, or on the first anniversary of a death can be said on any ferial weekday or memorials, including in the Octave of the Nativity, but excluding Ash Wednesday and Holy Week. 'Daily' masses for the dead may be celebrated on ferial weekdays in which there is no obligatory memorial.

Whilst Masses can be said with the intention of praying for Holy Souls in purgatory, there is no specific votive Mass or Mass for the Dead for Souls in purgatory compared to the suffrage Mass of the extraordinary form.

=== Extraordinary Form (Tridentine Form) ===
The idea of allowing votive Masses to be said only when no special feast occurs finally produced the rules contained in later missals (1570). According to these, there is a distinction between votive Masses strictly so called and votive Masses in a wider sense. The first are those commanded to be said on certain days; the second kind, those a priest may say or not, at his discretion.

Strict votive Masses are, first, those ordered by the rubrics of the Missal, namely a Mass of the Blessed Virgin on every Saturday in the year not occupied by a double, semi-double, octave, vigil, feria of Lent, or ember-day, or the transferred Sunday Office (Rubr. Gen., IV, 1). This is the "Missa de S. Maria" in five forms for various seasons, among the votive Masses at the end of the Missal. Votive Masses may also be ordered by the pope or the ordinary for certain grave occasions (pro re gravi). Such are for the election of a pope or bishop, in time of war, plague, persecution, and so on.

Such votive Masses may be ordered by the ordinary on all days except doubles of the first or second class, Ash Wednesday, and the ferias of Holy Week, the eves of Christmas and Pentecost; except also days on which the office is said for the same intention or event as would be prescribed by the votive Mass. In this case the Mass should conform to the office as usual. A third kind of strictly votive Mass is that said during the devotion of the so-called "Forty Hours". On this occasion the Mass on the first and third days is of the Blessed Sacrament; on the second day it is for peace. But on doubles of the first and second class, Sundays of the first and second class, on Ash Wednesday, in Holy Week, during the octaves of Epiphany, Easter, Pentecost, on the eves of Christmas and Pentecost, the Mass of the day must be said, with the collect of the Blessed Sacrament added to that of the day under one conclusion.

The other kind of votive Mass (late sumpta) may be said by any priest on a semidouble, simple or feria, at his discretion, except on Sunday, Ash Wednesday, the eves of Christmas, Epiphany, Pentecost, during the octaves of Epiphany, Easter, Pentecost, Corpus Christi, Holy Week, and on All Souls' Day. Nor may a votive Mass be said on a day whose Office is already that of the same occasion; but in this case the corresponding Mass of the day must be said, according to the usual rubrics. A votive Mass may be taken from any of those at the end of the missal, or of the common of Saints, or of their propers, if the text does not imply that it is their feast. A Sunday or ferial Mass may not be used as a votive Mass. Nor may it be said of a Beatus, unless this is allowed by special indult.

The Gloria is to be said in votive Masses pro re gravi unless the colour be violet; also in votive Masses of the Blessed Virgin on Saturday, of angels, whenever said, in those of saints, when said on a day on which they are named in the Martyrology or during their octaves. The Creed is said in solemn votive Masses pro re gravi. The first and third Masses of the Forty Hours have the Gloria and the Creed, not the Mass for Peace (but if said on a Sunday it has the Creed). Solemn votive Masses have only one collect; others are treated as semidoubles, with commemorations of the day, etc., according to the usual rule. The colour used for a votive Mass corresponds to the event celebrated, except that red is used for Holy Innocents. It is red for the election of a pope, white for the anniversary of a bishop's election or consecration, violet in the general case of asking for some special grace and for the Passion.

The particular case of votive Masses for each day of the week, corresponding to votive Offices ordered by Pope Leo XIII, was abolished by the Decree "Divino afflatu" of 1 November 1911. Requiems and Masses for marriages are really particular cases of a votive Mass.

== See also ==
- Communion of saints
- Gregorian Masses
- Privileged altar
