= Attavante degli Attavanti =

Italian painter

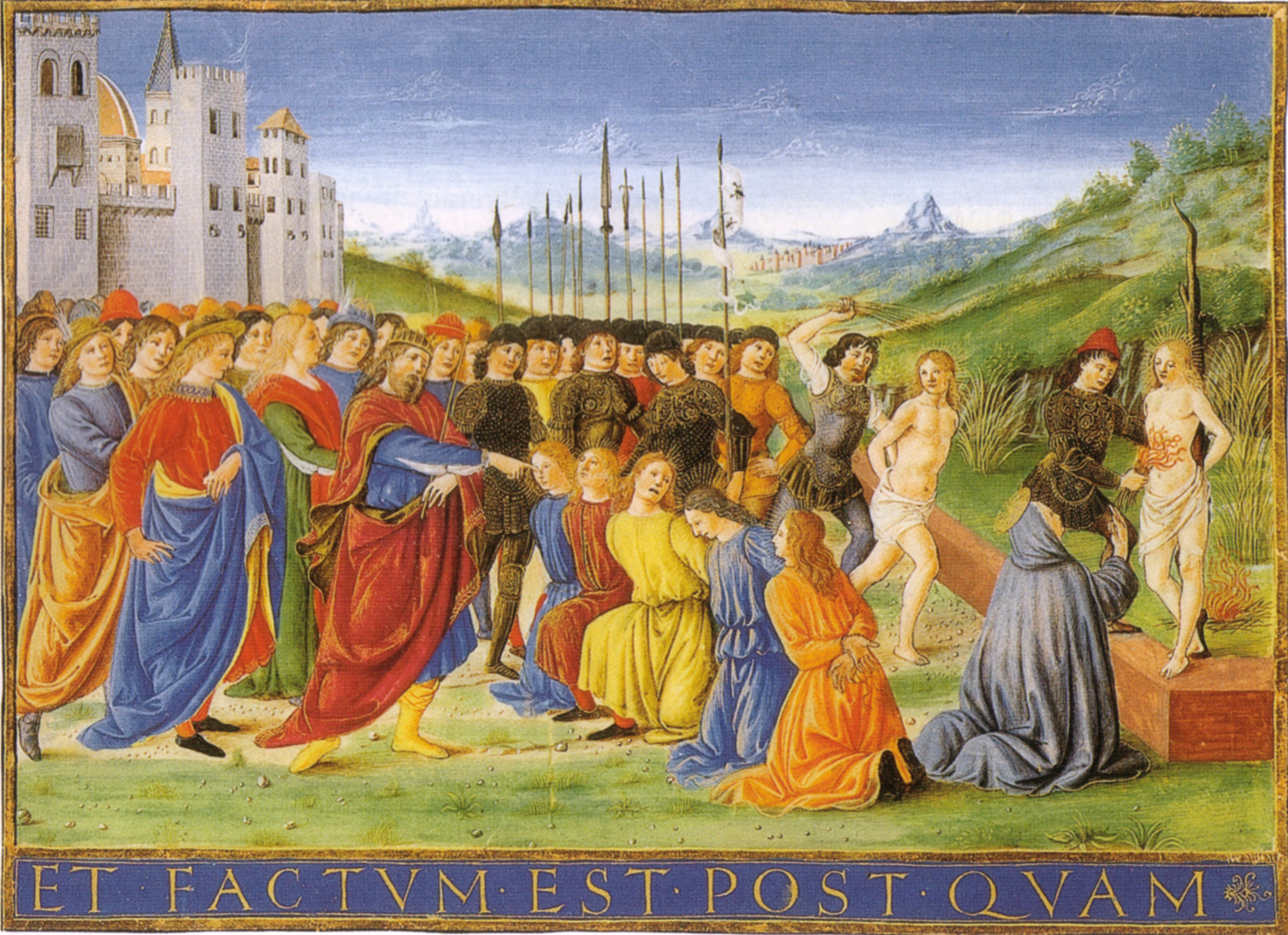
Martyrdom of the seven Hebrew brothers, Vatican Library, around 1450.

Attavante degli Attavanti (or Vante; 1452–1525) was an Italian painter.

An imitator of Bartolomeo della Gatta, he was employed by Matthias Corvinus, King of Hungary, for whom he executed a missal, now in the Royal Library at Brussels. There is another breviary by him in the National Library at Paris, executed in the manner of Domenico Ghirlandaio. Other missals in Florence and Rome are also ascribed to him. Attavante, who was a miniature painter of great merit, worked at Florence towards the close of the 15th century.

His workshop also produced the Jerome's Bible - one of the finest bibles ever to be produced in the Italian renaissance, now in the Portuguese national archives, Torre do Tombo.

An illuminated Book of Hours on vellum, attributed to Attavanti or to his "circle", was stolen from a London warehouse in January 2017, on its way to a book fair in the United States.

== Gallery ==
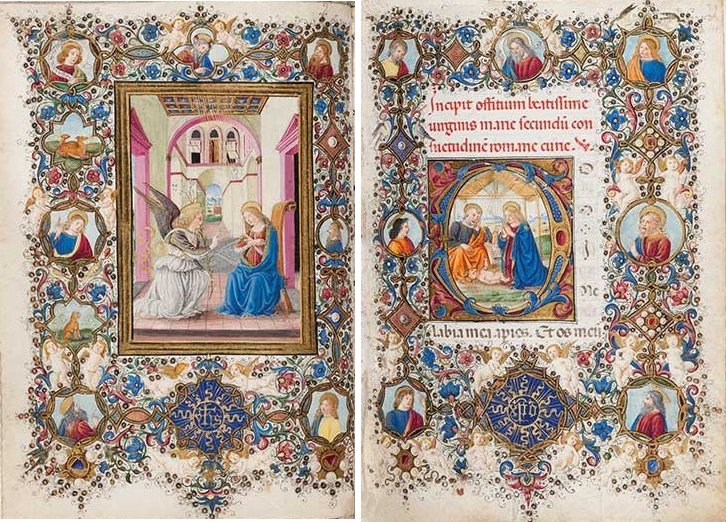
Book of Hours

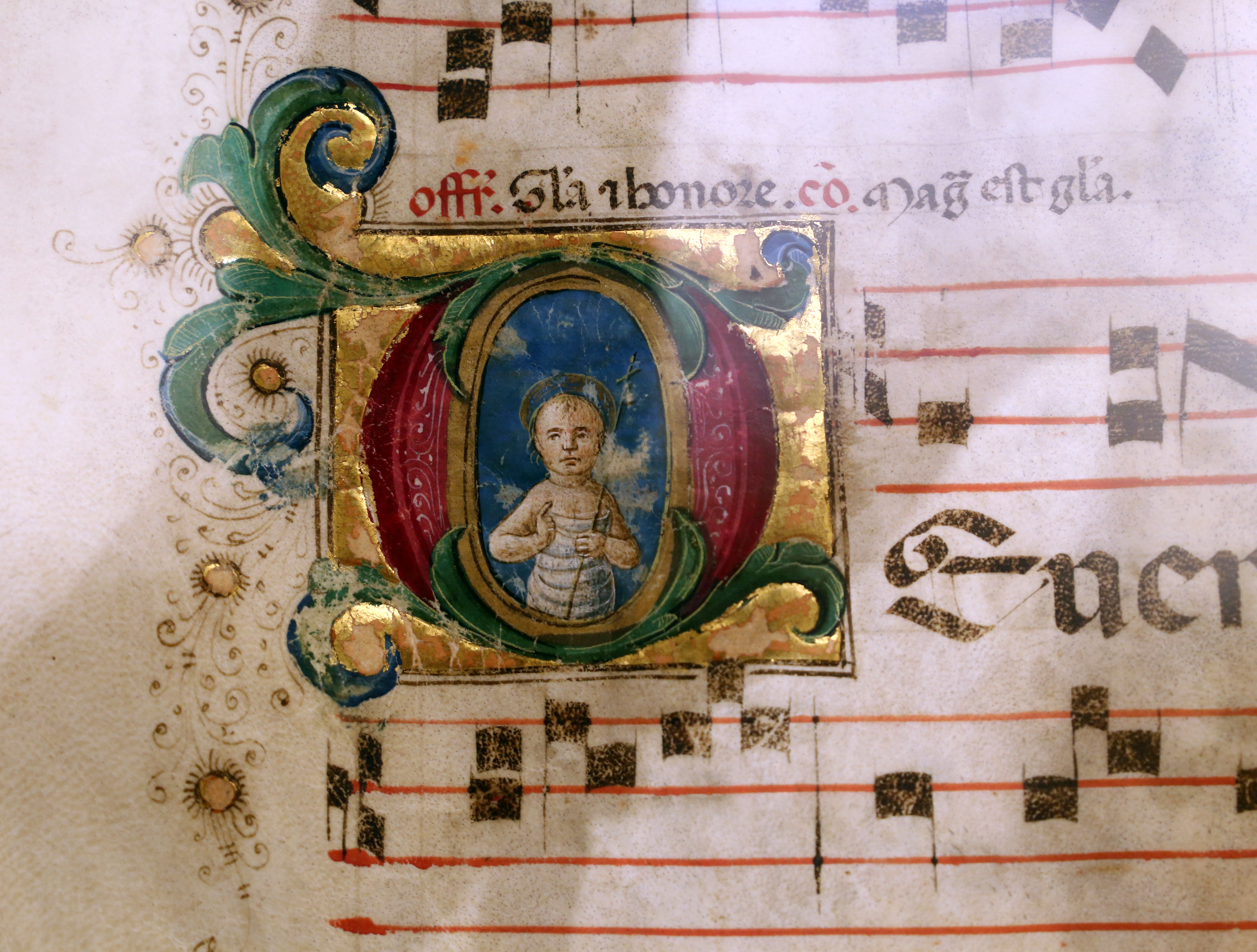
Circa 1470-80

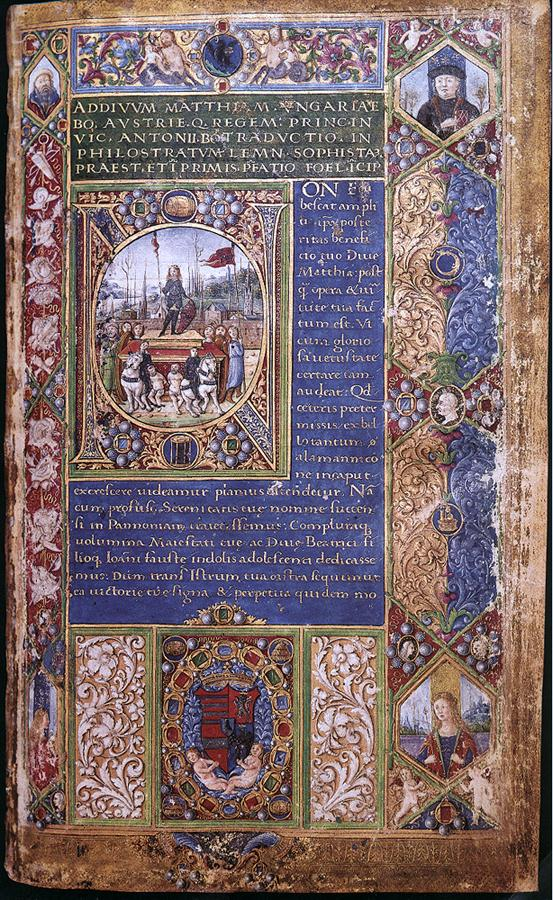
Codex Heroica by Philostratus

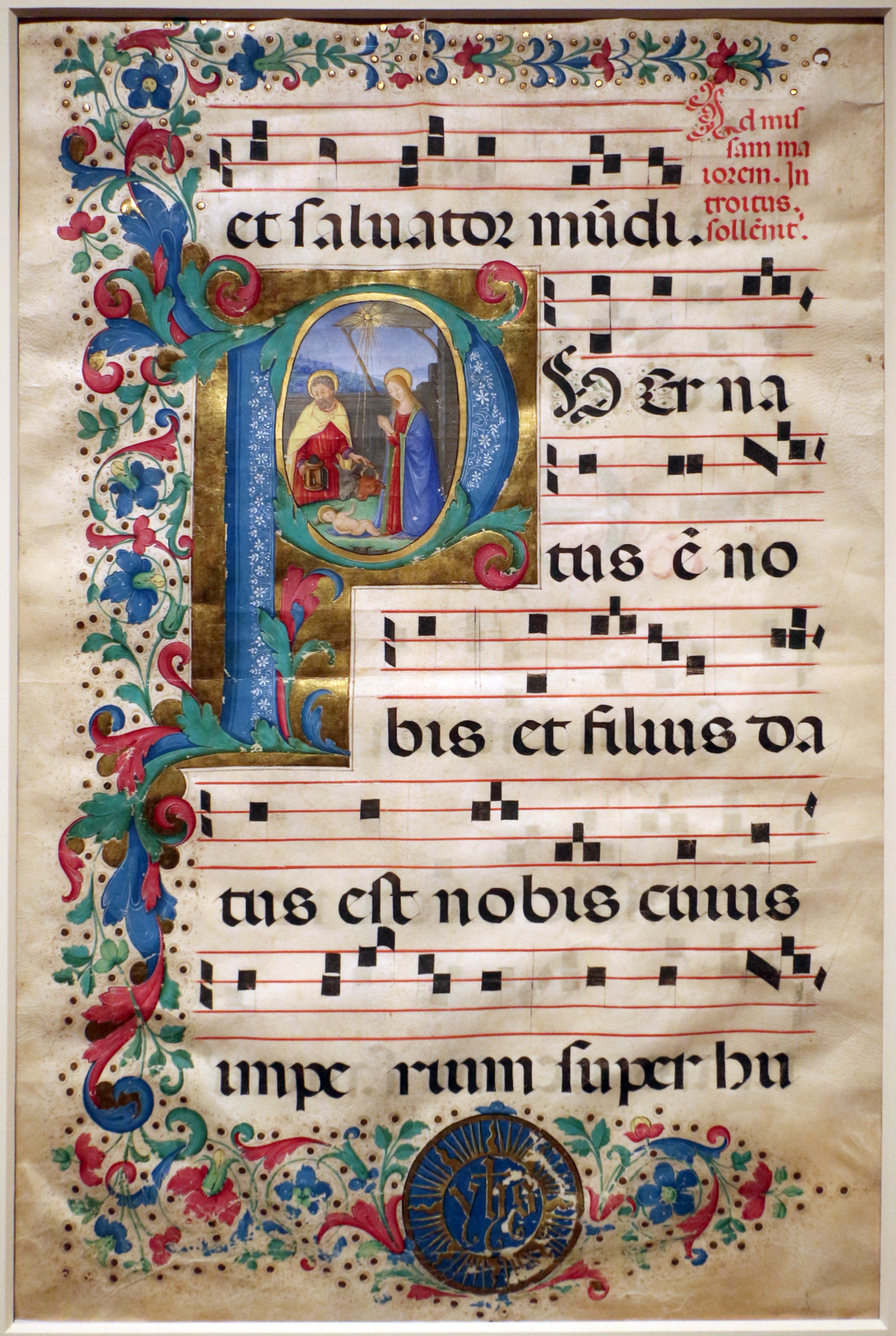
Page from a Gradual with an initial P and the Nativity, c.1500

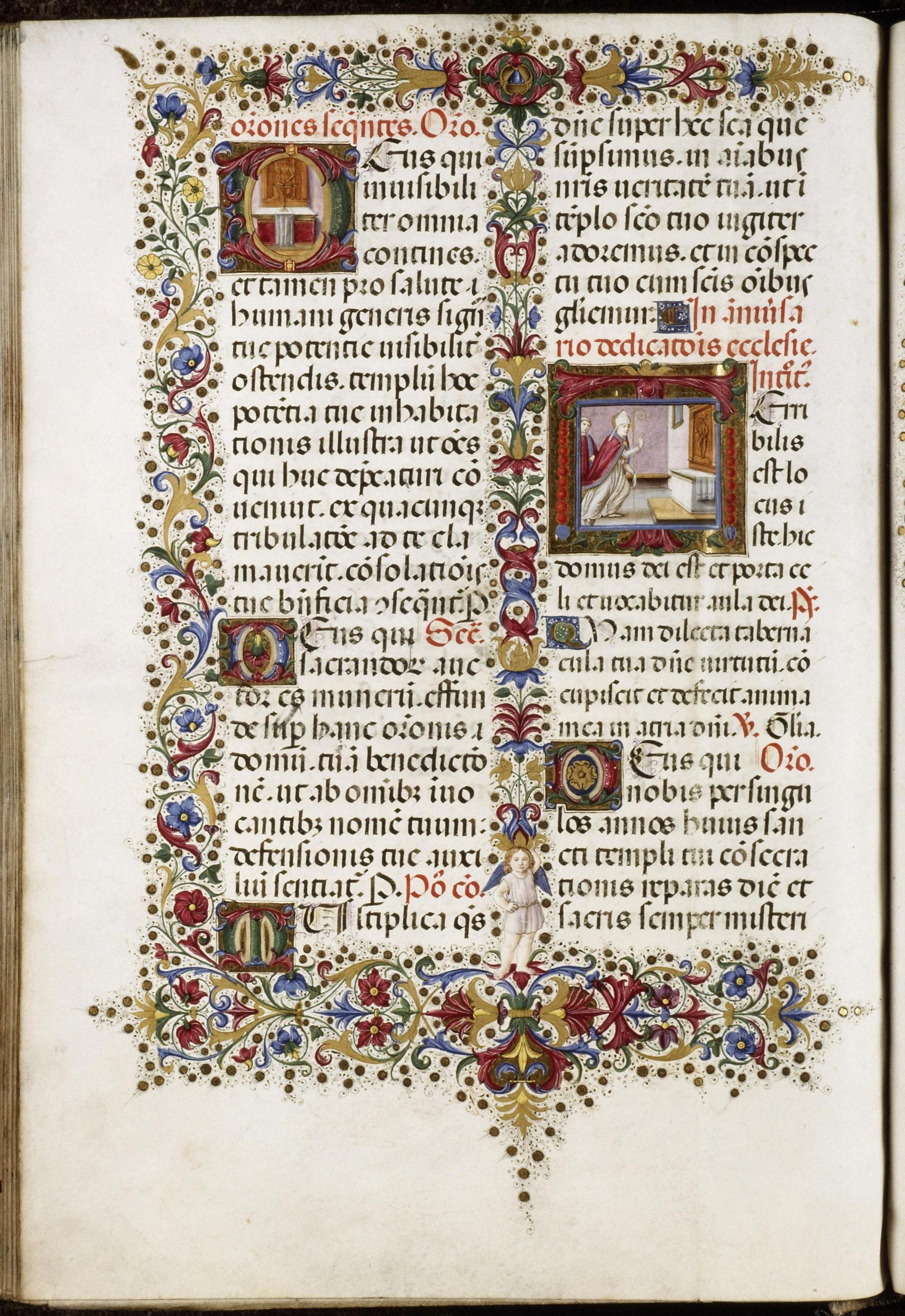
Missal of Thomas James

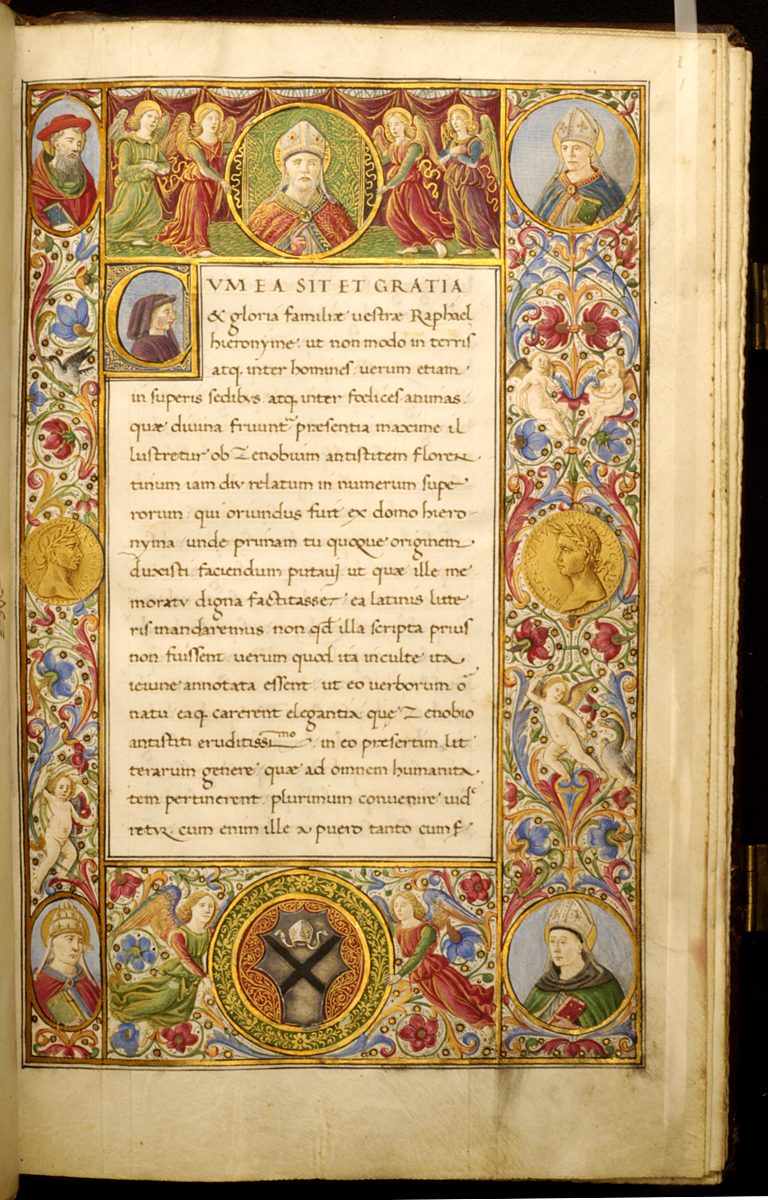
Leaf from Vita Zenobii Juliani da Girolamis, 1499

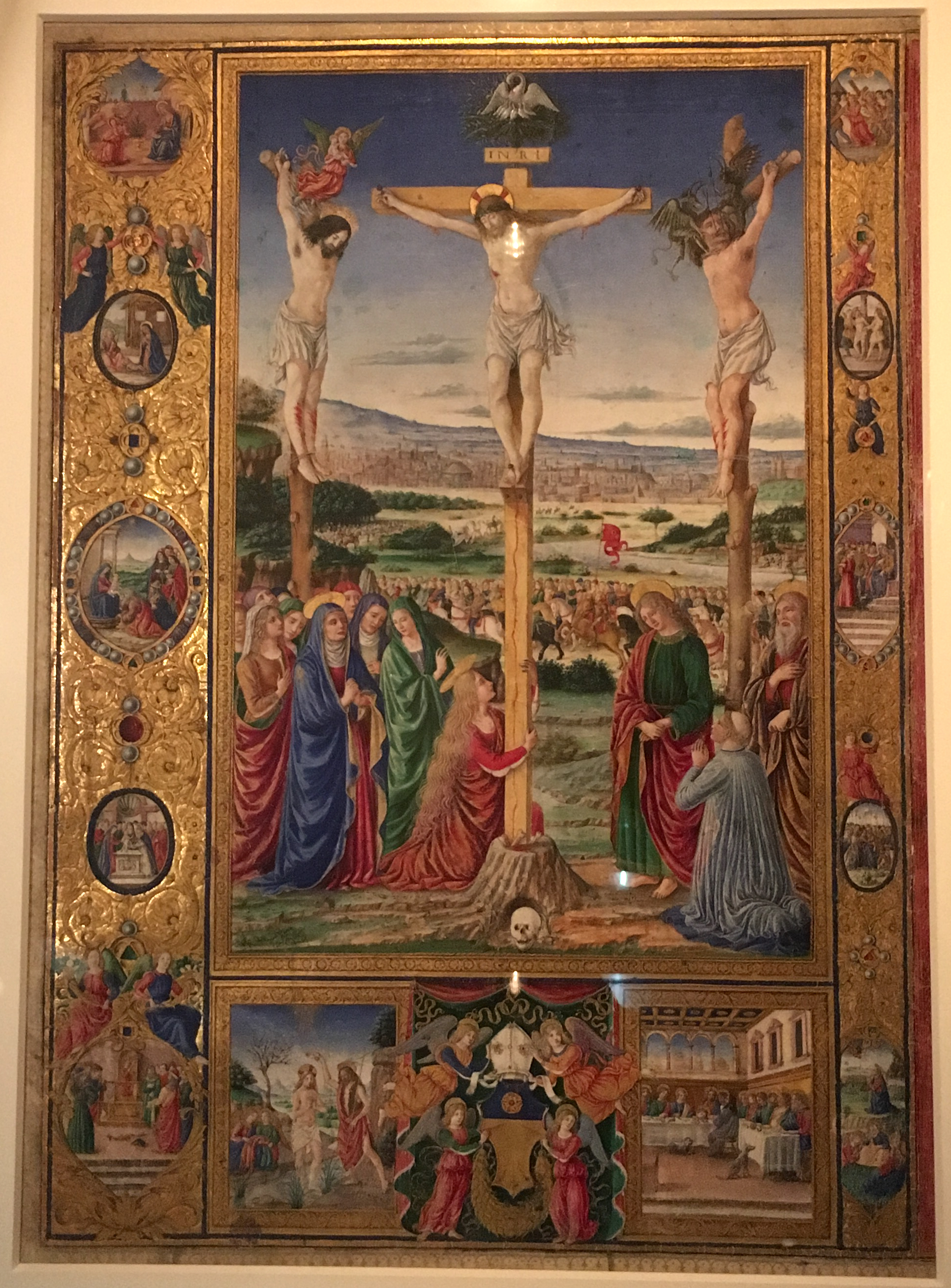
Crucifixion, circa 1483-1484
