= Gregorian Masses =

Roman Catholic tradition

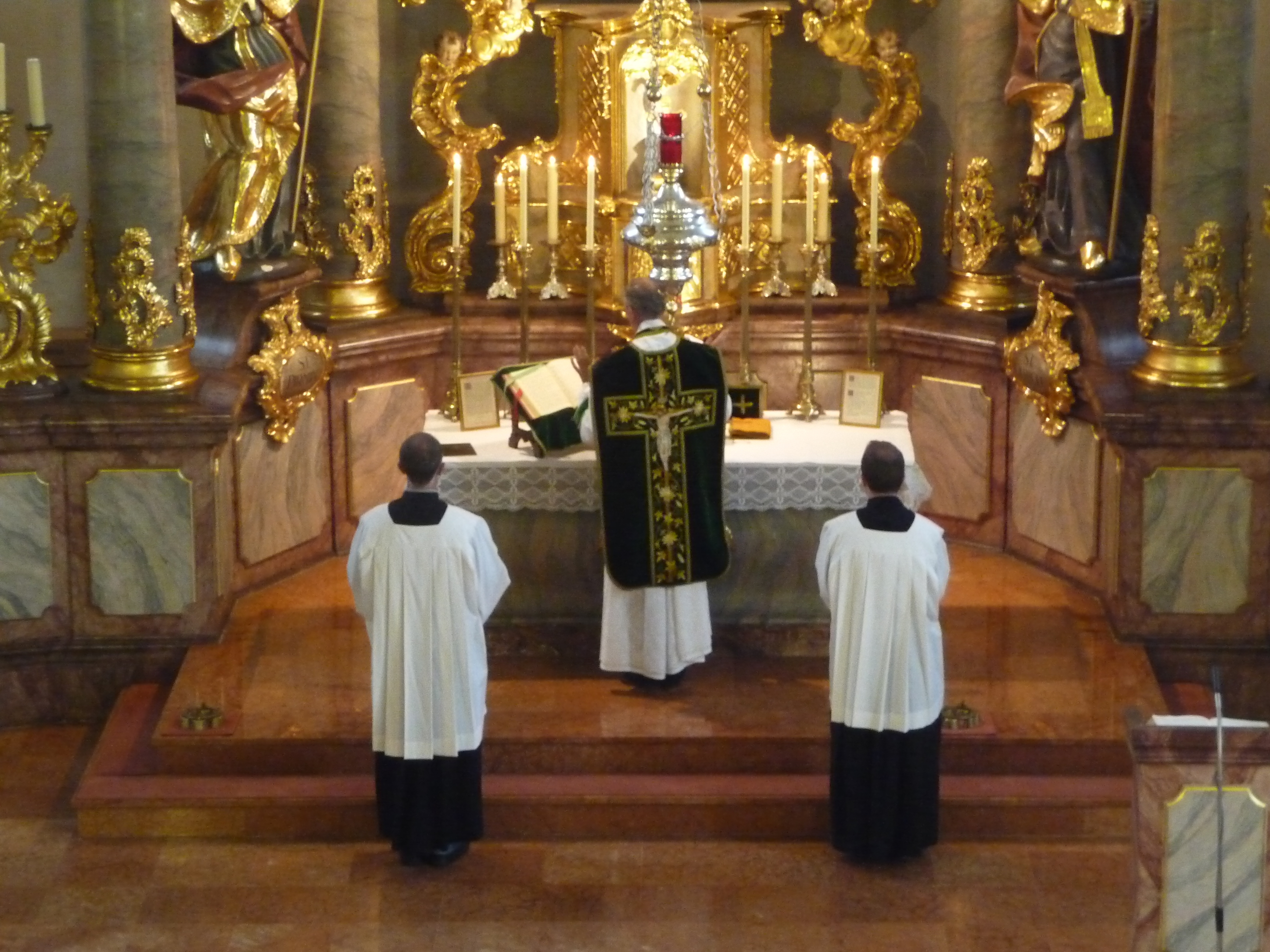
A traditional Requiem Mass

In Roman Catholicism, the practice of Gregorian Masses is an ancient tradition in which it is believed that a continuous series of thirty consecutive Masses said in thirty days for the soul of a deceased person will relieve their suffering and hasten their release from the punishments of Purgatory. Belief in the efficacy of the Gregorian Masses is based on a private revelation made to Pope Gregory the Great.

== History ==
The origin of mourning and praying for the dead for 30 days can be traced back to the Old Testament, where the Jews mourned for Moses for 30 days according to Deuteronomy 34:8

The history of the "Thirty Mass" practice goes back to the year 590 A.D. in St. Andrew's Monastery in Rome, founded by Gregory the Great in his own family villa around 570. It is now known as the Monastery of St. Gregory the Great. The account of the incident which gave rise to it is recounted by Gregory himself in his Dialogues.

After his election as Pope in 590, one of the monks, Justus by name, became ill. So he admitted to a lay friend, Copiosus, that he had hidden three gold pieces among his medications years before, when he was professed a monk. Both, in fact, were former physicians. And sure enough, the other monks found the gold when seeking the medication for Justus.

The founder and former abbot of the monastery, now Pope Gregory, hearing of this sin against the monastic Rule, called in the new abbot of his monastery, and ordered the penalty of solitary confinement for Justus, even though he was dying, and ordered that his burial not be in the cemetery but in the garbage dump. Copiosus told his friend of this decision. Moreover, the community were to recite over his grave the words of Peter to Simon the Magician: "May your money perish with you" (Acts 8:20).

The Pope's desired result was achieved: Justus made a serious repentance, and all the monks a serious examination of conscience. Justus then died, but the matter did not, for thirty days later Pope Gregory returned to the monastery filled with concern for Justus, who would now be suffering the grim temporal punishment of Purgatory's fire for his sins. "We must," said Gregory to the abbot, "come by charity to his aid, and as far as possible help him to escape this chastisement. Go and arrange thirty Masses for his soul, so that for thirty consecutive days the Saving Victim is immolated for him without fail." And so it was done.

Some days later, the deceased monk, Justus, appeared in a vision to his friend Copiosus and said, "I have just received the Communion pardon and release from Purgatory because of the Masses said for me." The monks did a calculation, and noted that it was exactly thirty days since the thirty Masses had begun for Justus. They shared this great consolation with each other, with their abbot and with Pope Gregory. The Pope included a full account of this episode.

== Status in the church ==
The Catholic Church has declared that the confidence of the faithful in the special efficacy of the Gregorian Masses is pious and reasonable. Its specific regulations are found in the Sacred Congregation for Indulgences of August 24, 1888. As 30 consecutive Masses are required, the Gregorian Masses are often incompatible with the Mass schedules of Catholic parishes. As such, Gregorian Masses are usually done in monasteries and seminaries, or by retired priests. The Masses can only be said for a single person at a time who is in purgatory, although it can be said by different priests and on different altars. If the soul of the intended person is already in Heaven, or if it is in Hell, the indulgences will help a different needy soul. The Masses must be said consecutively one day after another without any interruption. If the Masses are interrupted even for one day, the process is null and must start over again. The only exception is if the last few days of Holy Week occur during the Gregorian Masses; in this case, the Masses may be stopped until Easter Sunday and then continued on that day.

== Privileged altar ==
When the practice began, it was limited solely to services held at the main altar at the Monastery of St. Andrew in Rome, where this had taken place. As time went by, this "privilege" was extended to a few other altars in the city of Rome.

Eventually this practice became common in monasteries. A monk of the great Abbey of Cluny in the 11th century attested that such Masses were said daily in that period, with the exception of the major feastdays of the year, such as Easter. In the modern era, the practice was authorized for all churches throughout the world.

== See also ==
- Pope Gregory I
- Purgatory
