= Privileged altar =

Altar designation in the Roman Catholic Church

A Privileged Altar (Latin: Altare Privilegiatum) was an altar in a Roman Catholic church where a plenary indulgence could be applied in favor of a soul in purgatory by the priest celebrating Mass whenever Mass was celebrated there. This was an additional indulgence, over and above the graces and benefits normally flowing from the celebration of Mass.

Such altars were once granted by special concession, but later became widespread: the privilege was extended by the Pope to altars in many churches and by the twentieth century any bishop could designate one altar in each church under his jurisdiction as a privileged altar (normally the main altar for daily Mass in most parish churches). Such altars were supposed to have a plaque or inscription nearby: "altare privilegiatum".

Individual priests could, by various means, obtain a grant of a "personal privileged altar". This type of grant of the indulgence was not limited to a physical altar, as above, but traveled with the priest whenever, and wherever, he celebrated Mass. Such a privilege was automatically granted by law to cardinals and bishops, and could be obtained by priests upon request or by undertaking the "Heroic Act of Charity", a private commitment by the priest offering to God any indulgences he merited to be applied to the most needy souls in purgatory.

With the 1724 bull Omnium saluti of Pope Benedict XIII, a privileged altar could be permitted in every patriarchal, metropolitan or cathedral church.

The grants of privileged altars were replaced by Norm 20 of Pope Paul VI's Apostolic Constitution 'Indulgentiarum Doctrina', which expanded the grant of the indulgence explained above to all Masses, "whatsover", wherever and by whomever they are celebrated.
