= Hours of John the Fearless =

15th century book of hours

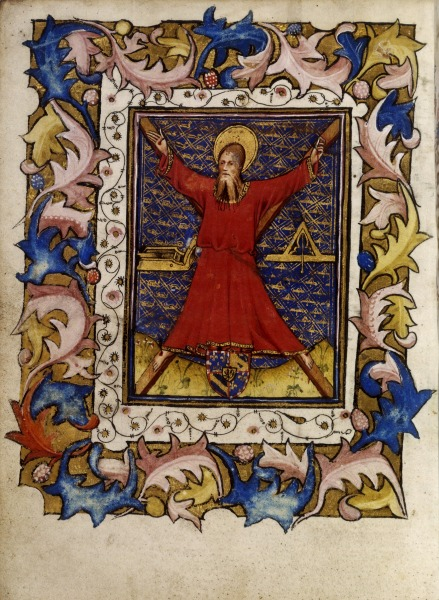
Saint Andrew in the book

The Hours of John the Fearless was an illuminated book of Hours produced in Flanders between 1406 and 1415 for John the Fearless. It contains 12 illustrated saints' calendars, 28 major miniatures and rectangular and acanthus-leaf borders, all following the Rome liturgy of the Hours. It is now in the Bibliothéque Nationale, Paris.
