= Grey-FitzPayn Hours =

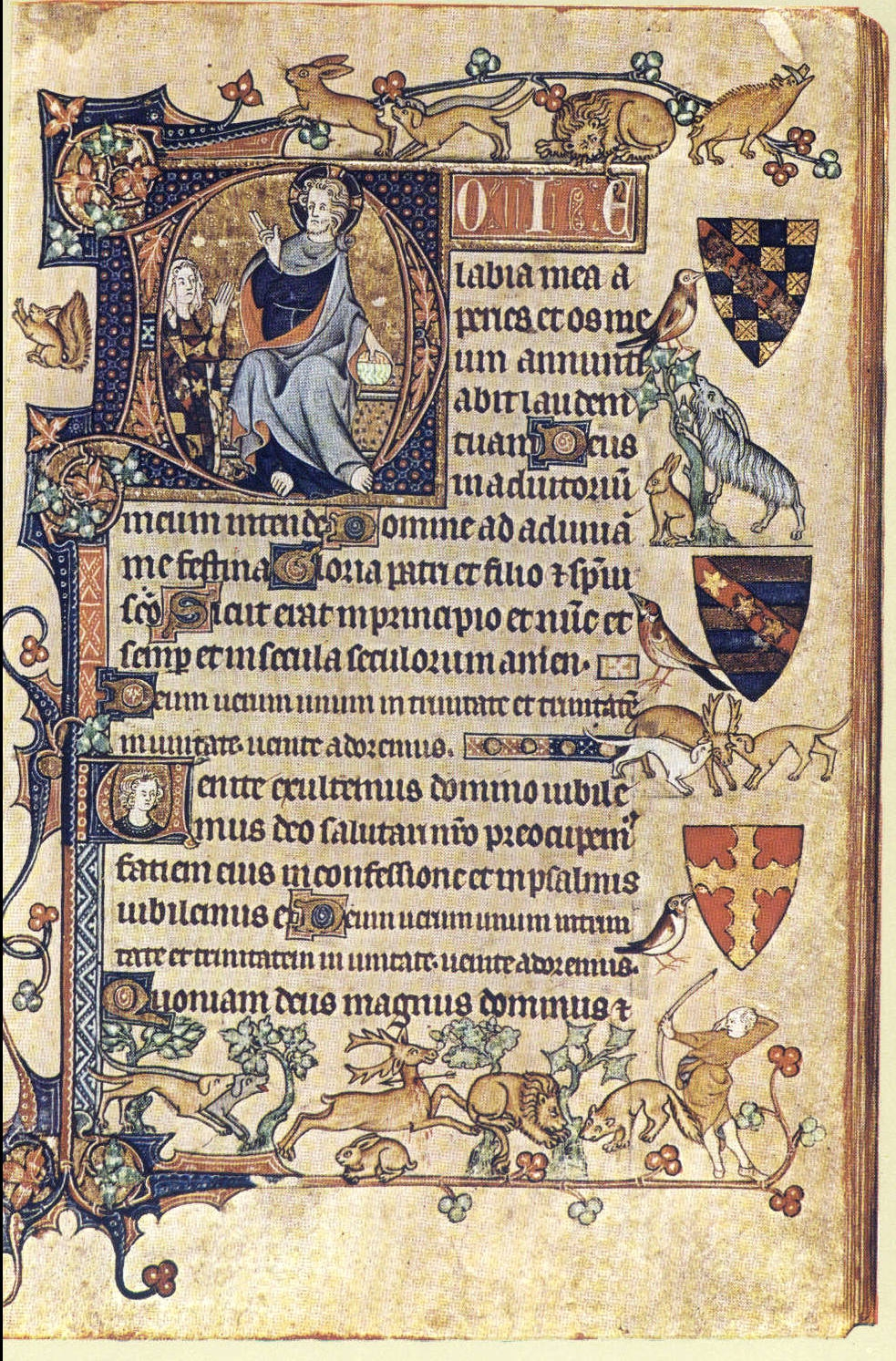
Christ blessing

The Grey-FitzPayn Hours is an illuminated book of hours formerly thought to have been commissioned by Sir Richard de Grey for his bride Joan FitzPayn, but now thought to have been made for members of the Pabenham and Clifford families, produced in the English Midlands around 1300 to 1308.

== Description ==
It follows the Use of Sarum, standard in England from the mid-13th century onwards. It is 24.5 cm by 17 cm, with 93 folios, 2 full-page miniatures, 3 large figured initials and other ornamental initials and borders. It is now at the Cambridge, Fitzwilliam Museum, MS. 242.
