= William de Brailes =

13th-century English manuscript illuminator

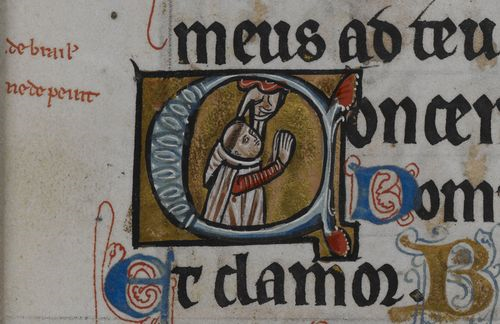
Folio 43r from the De Brailes Hours (British Library Add MS 49999) showing a signed self-portrait by "W de Brailes who painted me" (left margin).

William de Brailes (fl. c. 1230 – c. 1260) was an English Early Gothic manuscript illuminator, presumably born in Brailes, Warwickshire. He signed two manuscripts, and apparently worked in Oxford, where he is documented from 1238 to 1252, owning property in Catte Street near the University Church of St Mary the Virgin, roughly on the site now occupied by the chapel of All Souls College, where various members of the book trade lived. He was married, to Celena, but evidently also held minor orders, as at least three self-portraits show him with a clerical tonsure. This was not unusual: by this date, and with the exception of the St Albans monk Matthew Paris, the only other English illuminator of the period about whom we have significant personal information, most English illumination seems to have been done in commercial workshops run by laymen.

== Manuscripts ==
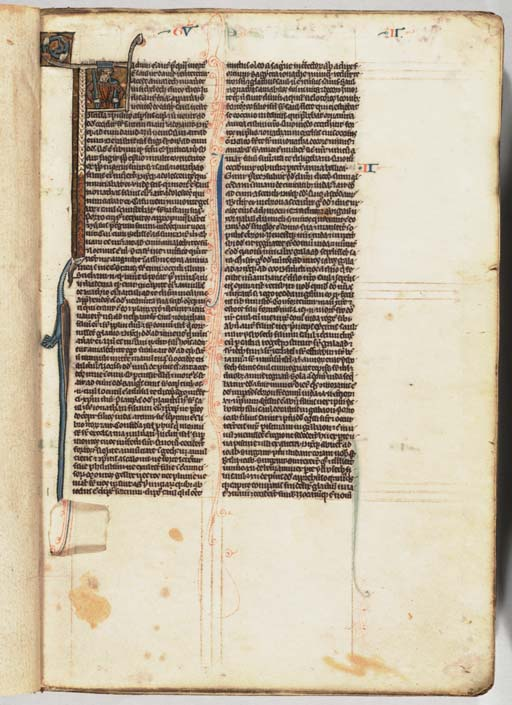
Typical page from a small Brailes Bible

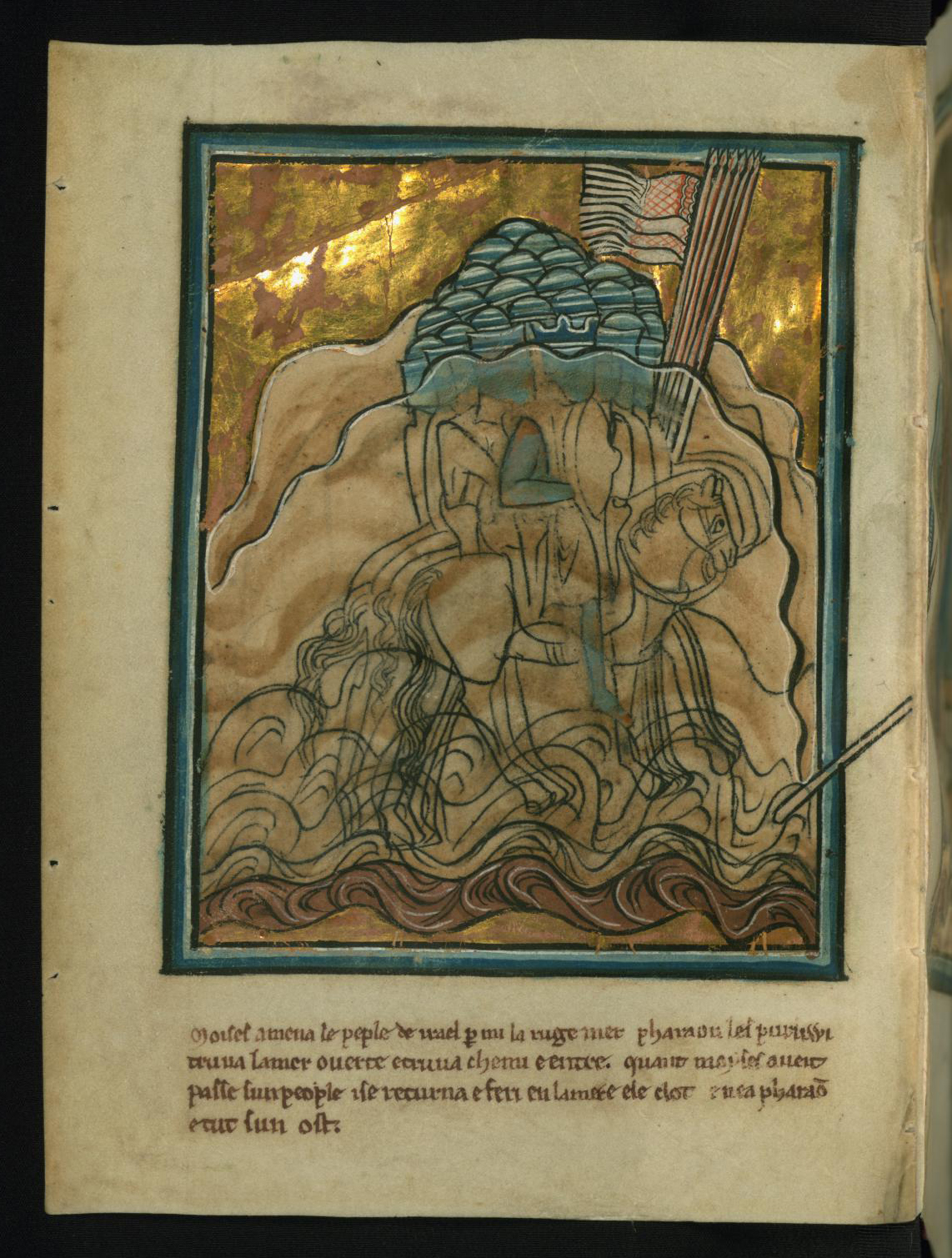
Page, probably from a psalter (Ms W.106, f. 11v), showing the Crossing of the Red Sea (Exodus 14:26:30)

William de Brailes illuminated Bibles, psalters, a Book of hours and secular texts, and may also have been a scribe. He is associated with a distinctive style, but other artists also worked in this manner, and distinguishing his hand from theirs is difficult. The style is characterised by energetic gesticulating figures, though with a limited range of facial expression, and a concern for narrative. Ornamental bars stretch out from historiated initials to the top or sides of the text, a feature in transition from the Romanesque style to the mature Gothic style, where decorative borders run round the whole page. Larger miniatures often contain different scenes in separate roundels. Most of his manuscripts have a page size similar to that of a standard modern paperback, and reflect the trend towards the personal ownership of books by well off but not extravagant members of both clergy and laity.

The principal works attributed to Brailes and his workshop include:

- The "De Brailes Hours" in the British Library (Add MS 49999) is the earliest surviving separate English Book of hours (it has incorrectly been claimed to be the earliest anywhere, and the prototype of the form), the type of book that was to become the leading vehicle for illumination in the late Middle Ages. It was probably created for an unknown laywoman whose generic "portrait" is shown four times. It has been suggested she was from North Hinksey near Oxford, and possibly called Suzanna. Signed twice by "W. de Brail", adding once "q[ui]. me depeint" ("who painted me"). Despite its small size of 150 x 123 mm, it contains a large number of historiated initials and full page miniatures introducing sections.
- A series of small leaves (135 x 98 mm) illuminated on one or both sides with full-page miniatures, probably from a psalter (perhaps a psalter now in Stockholm which has a major historiated initial by de Brailes), with twenty four now in the Walters Art Museum, Baltimore, and seven in the Wildenstein Collection, Musée Marmottan Paris.
- "The New College Psalter", at 350 x 250 mm, the "largest and most elaborate extant work from the de Brailes workshop", and relatively late in date, this work belongs to the category of luxury psalters, with an illuminated calendar and abundant decoration throughout, although there is no cycle of full-page miniatures.
- Miniatures from a Psalter, consisting of six leaves in the Fitzwilliam Museum and one in the Morgan Library extant, from a series of full-page illuminations on the Old and New Testaments (215 x 143 mm).
- Bible with some Masses (British Library, Harley MS. 2813) – recently attributed, for a Franciscan patron, 183 x 133 mm, with two remaining historiated initials.
- Bible with some Masses, in the Bodleian Library, Oxford. A small (167 x 116 mm) Bible, probably made for a Dominican patron.
- Bible in Gonville and Caius College, Cambridge – the workshop's "most elaborate surviving example of Bible illustration", with 79 illuminated, mostly historiated, initials from which the decoration typically extends down the page. 245 x 175 mm.
- A Bible whose surviving fragments are dispersed among several collections: the chief surviving portion (155 folios) is Lewis Ms E 29 in the Free Library of Philadelphia, 182 x 113 mm, with many historiated initials. Fourteen leaves from this manuscript are now in the Lilly Library at Indiana University as Ricketts C:1 (1 leaf), Ricketts III:25 (1 leaf), and Ricketts III: 53 (12 leaves). Other leaves from this same manuscript are dispersed in private collections in England.
