= Book of hours =

Type of Christian devotional book, popular in the Middle Ages

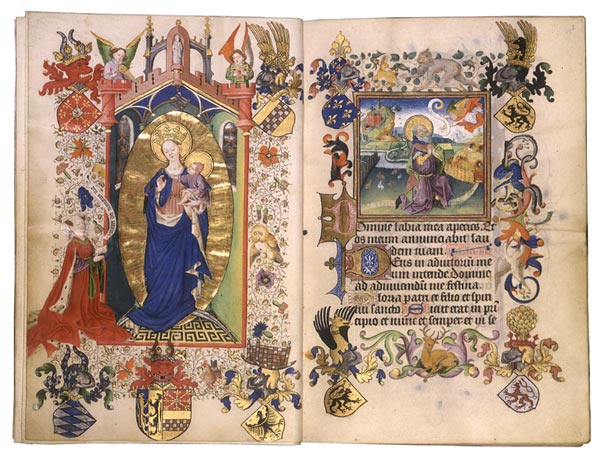
Opening from the Hours of Catherine of Cleves, c. 1440, with Catherine kneeling before the Virgin and Child, surrounded by her family heraldry. Opposite is the start of Matins in the Little Office, illustrated by the Annunciation to Joachim, as the start of a long cycle of the Life of the Virgin.

Books of hours (Latin: horae) are Christian prayer books, which were used to pray the canonical hours. The use of a book of hours was especially popular in the Middle Ages, and as a result, they are the most common type of surviving medieval illuminated manuscript. Like every manuscript, each manuscript book of hours is unique in one way or another, but most contain a similar collection of texts, prayers and psalms, often with appropriate decorations, for Christian devotion. Illumination or decoration is minimal in many examples, often restricted to decorated capital letters at the start of psalms and other prayers, but books made for wealthy patrons may be extremely lavish, with full-page miniatures. These illustrations would combine picturesque scenes of country life with sacred images.

Books of hours were usually written in Latin (they were largely known by the name horae until "book of hours" was relatively recently applied to them), although there are many entirely or partially written in vernacular European languages, especially Dutch. The closely related primer is occasionally considered synonymous with books of hours – a medieval horae was referred to as a primer in Middle English – but their contents and purposes could deviate significantly from the simple recitation of the canonical hours. Tens of thousands of books of hours have survived to the present day, in libraries and private collections throughout the world.

The typical book of hours is an abbreviated form of the breviary, which contains the Divine Office recited in monasteries. It was developed for lay people who wished to incorporate elements of monasticism into their devotional life. Reciting the hours typically centered upon the reading of a number of psalms and other prayers.

A typical book of hours contains the Calendar of Church feasts, extracts from the Four Gospels, the Mass readings for major feasts, the Little Office of the Blessed Virgin Mary, the fifteen Psalms of Degrees, the seven Penitential Psalms, a Litany of Saints, an Office for the Dead and the Hours of the Cross. Most 15th-century books of hours have these basic contents. The Marian prayers Obsecro te ("I beseech thee") and O Intemerata ("O undefiled one") were frequently added, as were devotions for use at Mass, and meditations on the Passion of Christ, among other optional texts. Such books of hours continue to be used by many Christians today, such as the Catholic Key of Heaven prayer books, the Agpeya of Coptic Christianity or The Brotherhood Prayer Book of Lutheranism.

== History ==
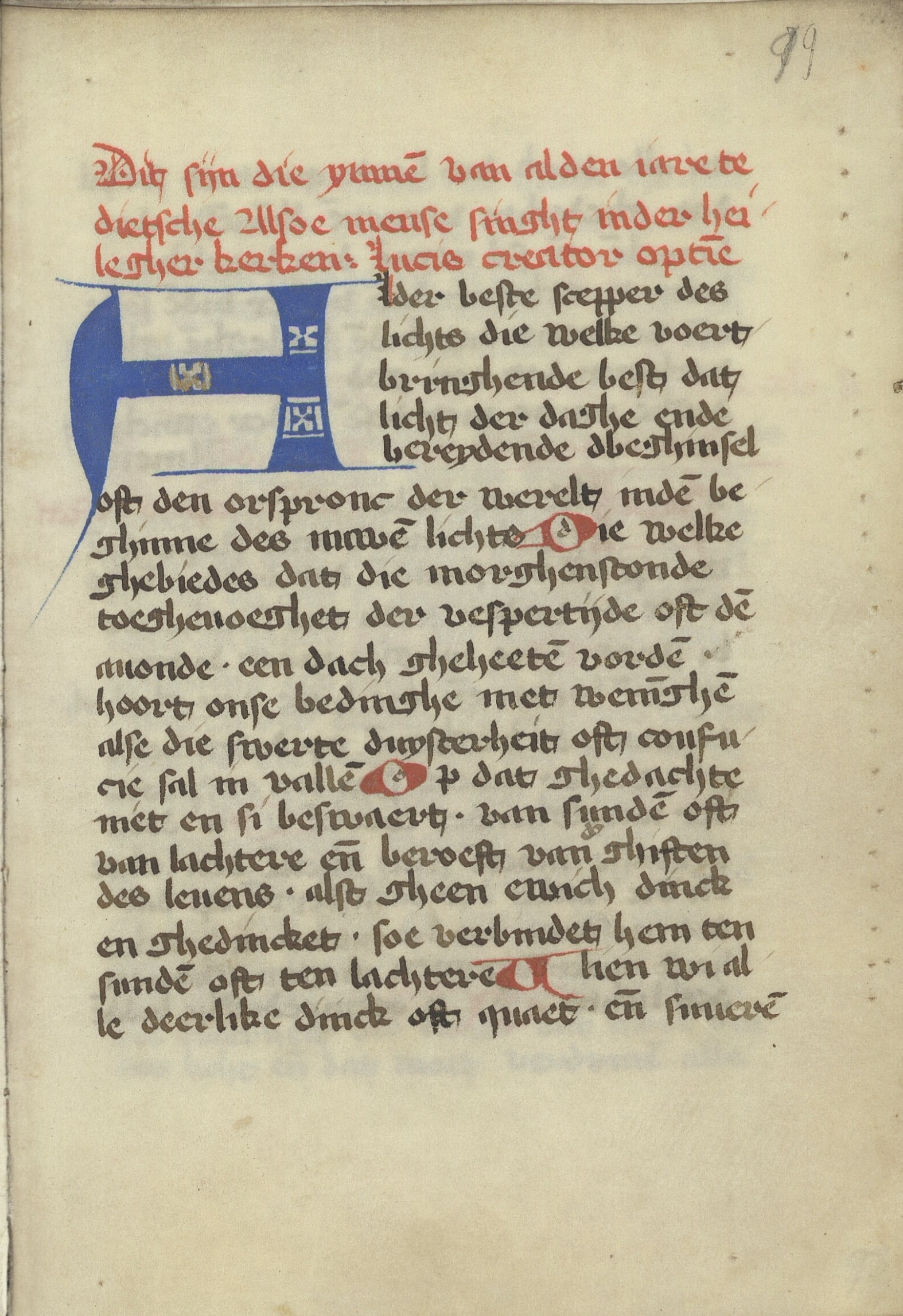
Example of a more affordable and thus more common book of hours: Excerpt from a "simple" Middle Dutch book of hours. Made in the 2nd half of the fifteenth century in Brabant.

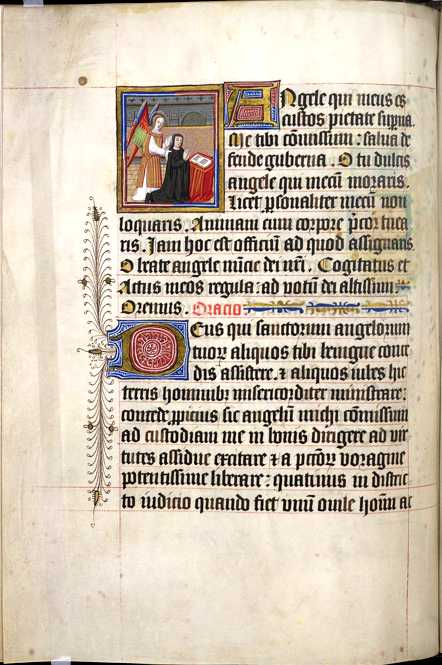
Even this level of decoration is richer than those of most books, though less than the lavish amounts of illumination in luxury books, which are the ones most often seen reproduced.

The book of hours has its ultimate origin in the Psalter, which monks and nuns were required to recite. By the 12th century this had developed into the breviary, with weekly cycles of psalms, prayers, hymns, antiphons, and readings which changed with the liturgical season. Eventually a selection of texts was produced in much shorter volumes and came to be called a book of hours. During the latter part of the thirteenth century the Book of Hours became popular as a personal prayer book for men and women who led secular lives. It consisted of a selection of prayers, psalms, hymns and lessons based on the liturgy of the clergy. Each book was unique in its content though all included the Hours of the Virgin Mary, devotions to be made during the eight canonical hours of the day, the reasoning behind the name 'Book of Hours'.

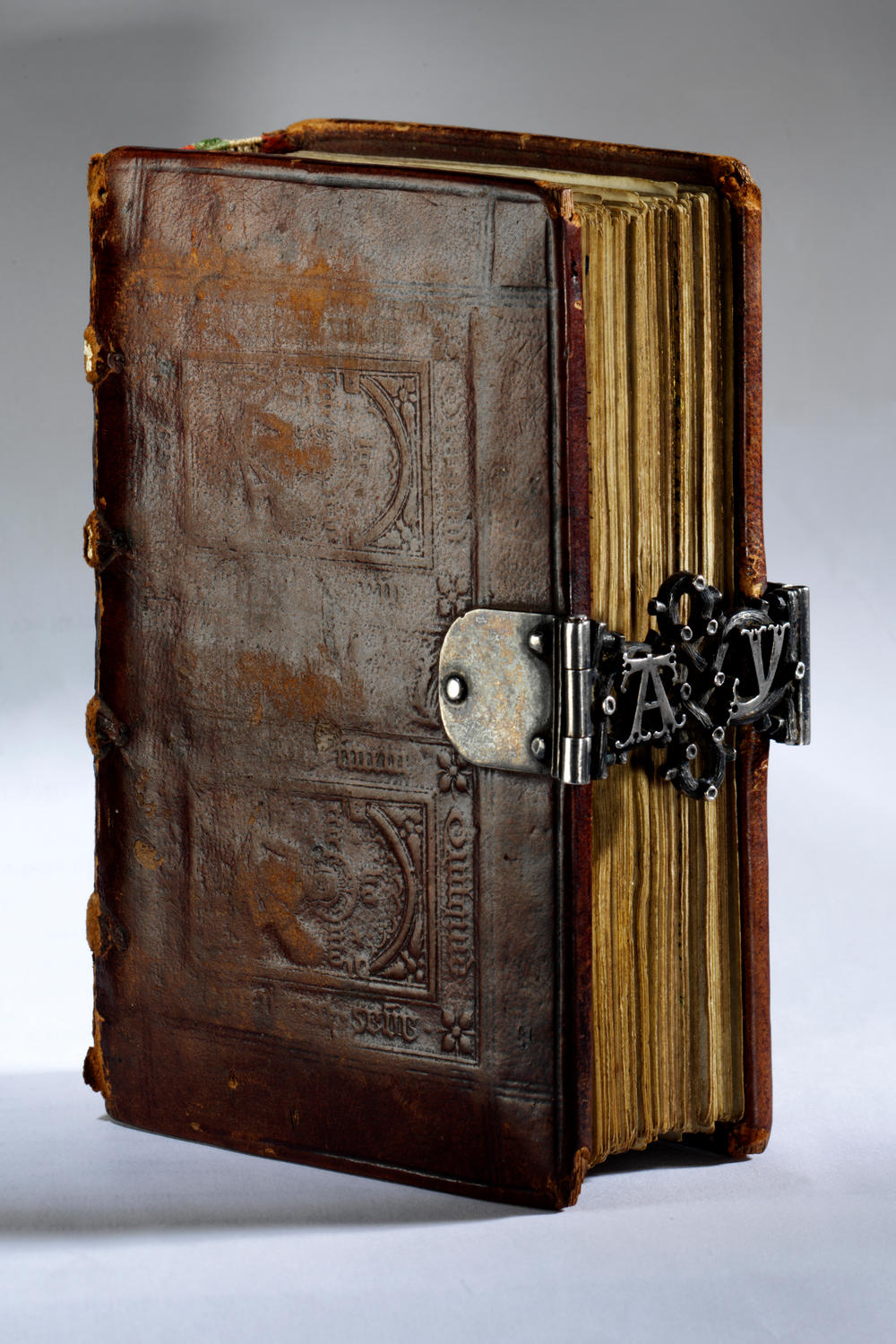
van Reynegom Book of Hours, c. 15th century, collection Royal Library of Belgium & King Baudouin Foundation

Many books of hours were made for women. There is some evidence that they were sometimes given as a wedding present from a husband to his bride. Frequently they were passed down through the family, as recorded in wills. Until about the 15th century paper was rare and most books of hours consisted of parchment sheets made from animal skins.

Although the most heavily illuminated books of hours were enormously expensive, a small book with little or no illumination was affordable much more widely, and increasingly so during the 15th century. The earliest surviving English example was apparently written for a laywoman living in or near Oxford in about 1240. It is smaller than a modern paperback but heavily illuminated with major initials, but no full-page miniatures. By the 15th century, there are also examples of servants owning their own Books of Hours. In a court case from 1500, a pauper woman is accused of stealing a domestic servant's prayerbook.

Very rarely the books included prayers specifically composed for their owners, but more often the texts are adapted to their tastes or gender, including the inclusion of their names in prayers. Some include images depicting their owners, and some their coats of arms. These, together with the choice of saints commemorated in the calendar and suffrages, are the main clues for the identity of the first owner. Eamon Duffy explains how these books reflected the person who commissioned them. He claims that the "personal character of these books was often signaled by the inclusion of prayers specially composed or adapted for their owners." Furthermore, he states that "as many as half the surviving manuscript Books of Hours have annotations, marginalia or additions of some sort. Such additions might amount to no more than the insertion of some regional or personal patron saint in the standardized calendar, but they often include devotional material added by the owner. Owners could write in specific dates important to them, notes on the months where things happened that they wished to remember, and even the images found within these books would be personalized to the owners—such as localized saints and local festivities.

By at least the 15th century, the Netherlands and Paris workshops were producing books of hours for stock or distribution, rather than waiting for individual commissions. These were sometimes with spaces left for the addition of personalized elements such as local feasts or heraldry.

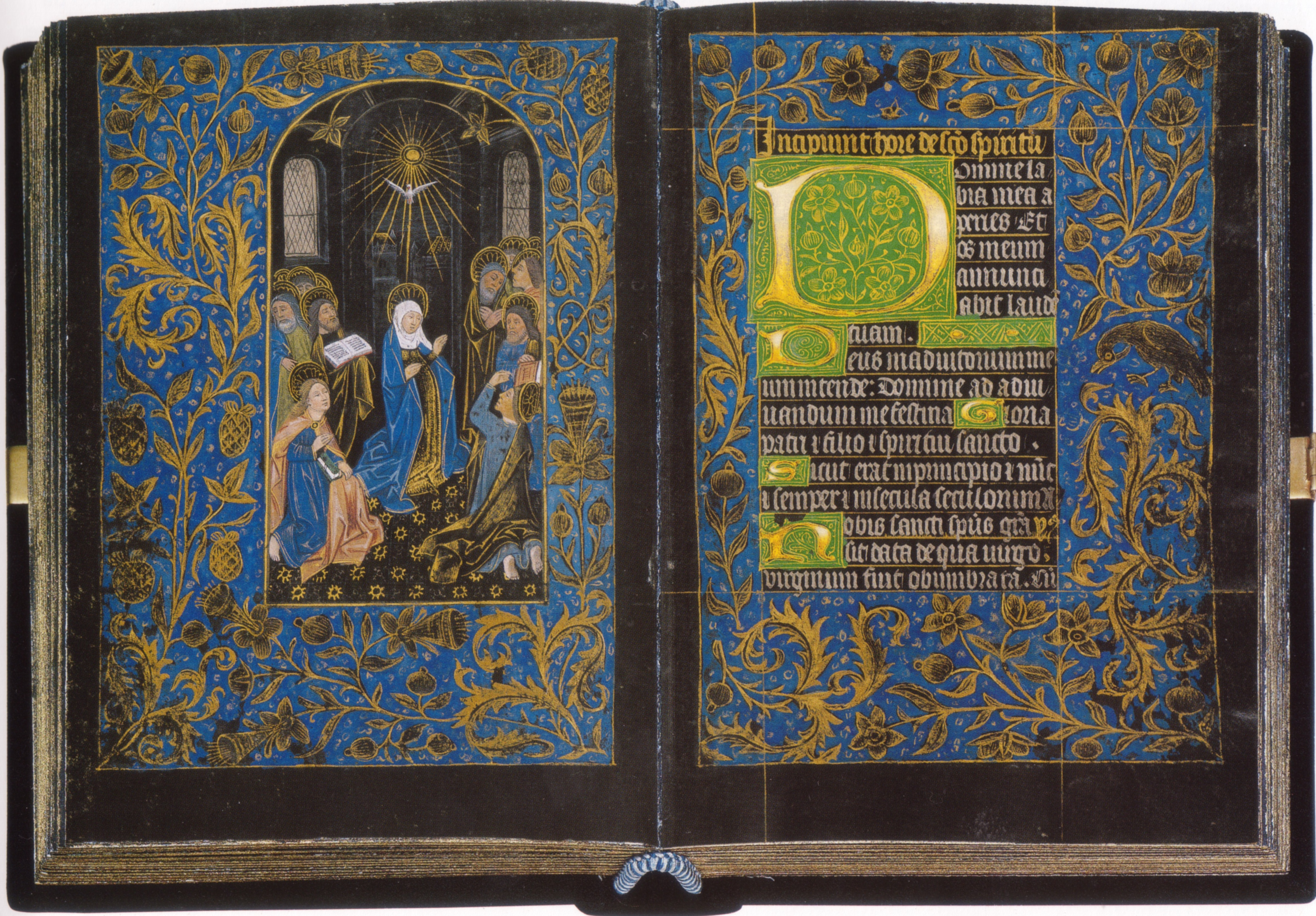
Black Hours, Morgan MS 493, Pentecost, Folios 18v/19r, c. 1475–80. Morgan Library & Museum, New York

The style and layout for traditional books of hours became increasingly standardized around the middle of the thirteenth century. The new style can be seen in the books produced by the Oxford illuminator William de Brailes who ran a commercial workshop (he was in minor orders). His books included various aspects of the Church's breviary and other liturgical aspects for use by the laity. "He incorporated a perpetual calendar, Gospels, prayers to the Virgin Mary, the Stations of the Cross, prayers to the Holy Spirit, Penitential psalms, litanies, prayers for the dead, and suffrages to the Saints. The book's goal was to help his devout patroness to structure her daily spiritual life in accordance with the eight canonical hours, Matins to Compline, observed by all devout members of the Church. The text, augmented by rubrication, gilding, miniatures, and beautiful illuminations, sought to inspire meditation on the mysteries of faith, the sacrifice made by Christ for man, and the horrors of hell, and to especially highlight devotion to the Virgin Mary whose popularity was at a zenith during the 13th century." This arrangement was maintained over the years as many aristocrats commissioned the production of their own books.

By the end of the 15th century, the advent of printing made books more affordable and much of the emerging middle-class could afford to buy a printed book of hours, and new manuscripts were only commissioned by the very wealthy. The Kitab salat al-sawai (1514), widely considered the first book in Arabic printed using moveable type, is a book of hours intended for Arabic-speaking Christians and presumably commissioned by Pope Julius II.

== Decoration ==
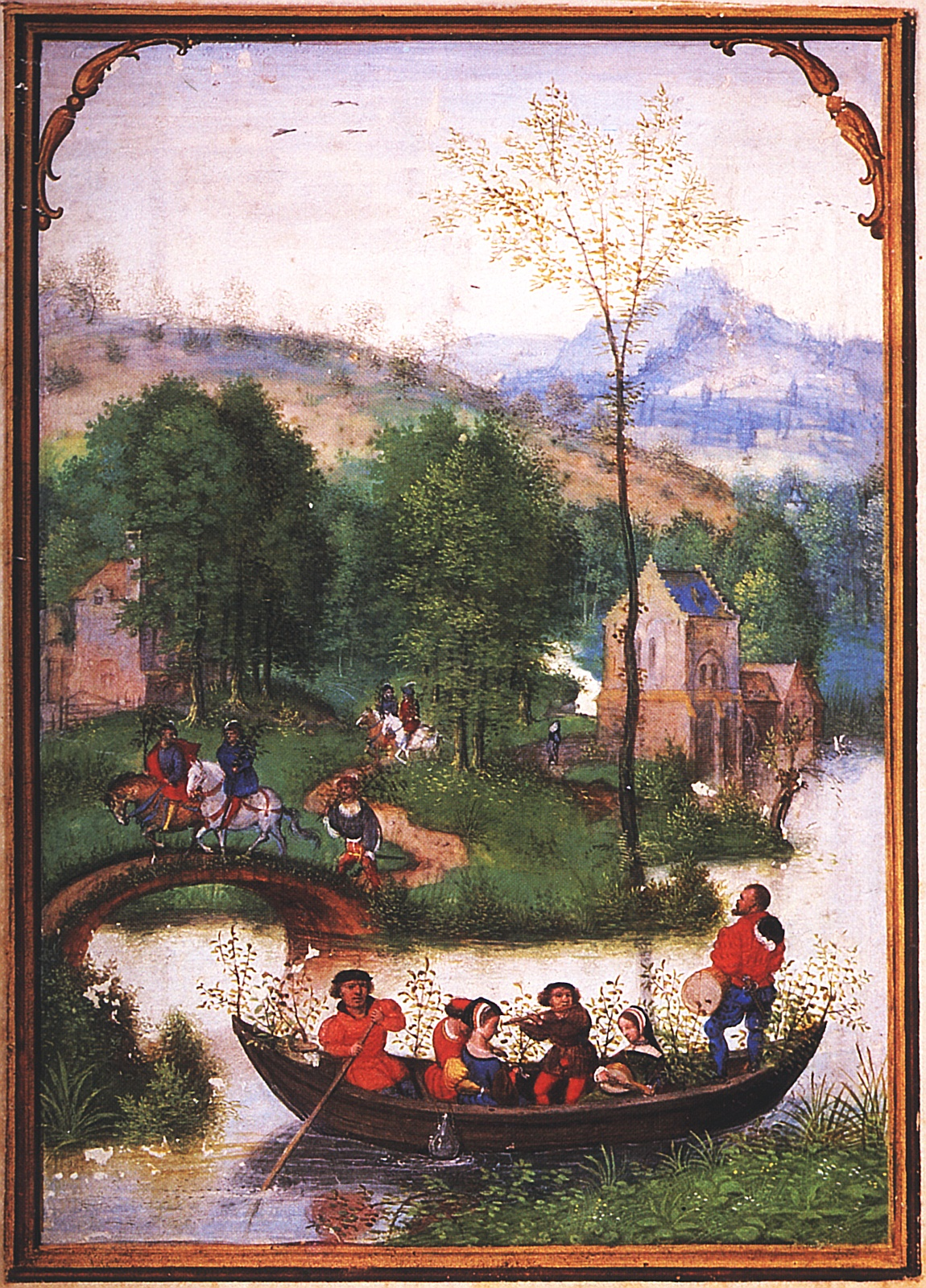
A full-page miniature of May, from a calendar cycle by Simon Bening, early 16th century.

As many books of hours are richly illuminated, they form an important record of life in the 15th and 16th centuries as well as the iconography of medieval Christianity. Some of them were also decorated with jewelled covers, portraits, and heraldic emblems. Some were bound as girdle books for easy carrying, though few of these or other medieval bindings have survived. Luxury books, like the Talbot Hours of John Talbot, 1st Earl of Shrewsbury, may include a portrait of the owner, and in this case his wife, kneeling in adoration of the Virgin and Child as a form of donor portrait. In expensive books, miniature cycles showed the Life of the Virgin or the Passion of Christ in eight scenes decorating the eight Hours of the Virgin, and the Labours of the Months and signs of the zodiac decorating the calendar. Secular scenes of calendar cycles include many of the best known images from books of hours, and played an important role in the early history of landscape painting.

From the 14th century decorated borders round the edges of at least important pages were common in heavily illuminated books, including books of hours. At the beginning of the 15th century these were still usually based on foliage designs, and painted on a plain background, but by the second half of the century coloured or patterned backgrounds with images of all sorts of objects, were used in luxury books.

Second-hand books of hours were often modified for new owners, even among royalty. After defeating Richard III, Henry VII gave Richard's book of hours to his mother, who modified it to include her name. Heraldry was usually erased or over-painted by new owners. Many have handwritten annotations, personal additions and marginal notes but some new owners also commissioned new craftsmen to include more illustrations or texts. Sir Thomas Lewkenor of Trotton hired an illustrator to add details to what is now known as the Lewkenor Hours. Flyleaves of some surviving books include notes of household accounting or records of births and deaths, in the manner of later family bibles. Some owners had also collected autographs of notable visitors to their house. Books of hours were often the only book in a house, and were commonly used to teach children to read, sometimes having a page with the alphabet to assist this.

Towards the end of the 15th century, printers produced books of hours with woodcut illustrations, and the book of hours was one of the main works decorated in the related metalcut technique.

== The luxury book of hours ==
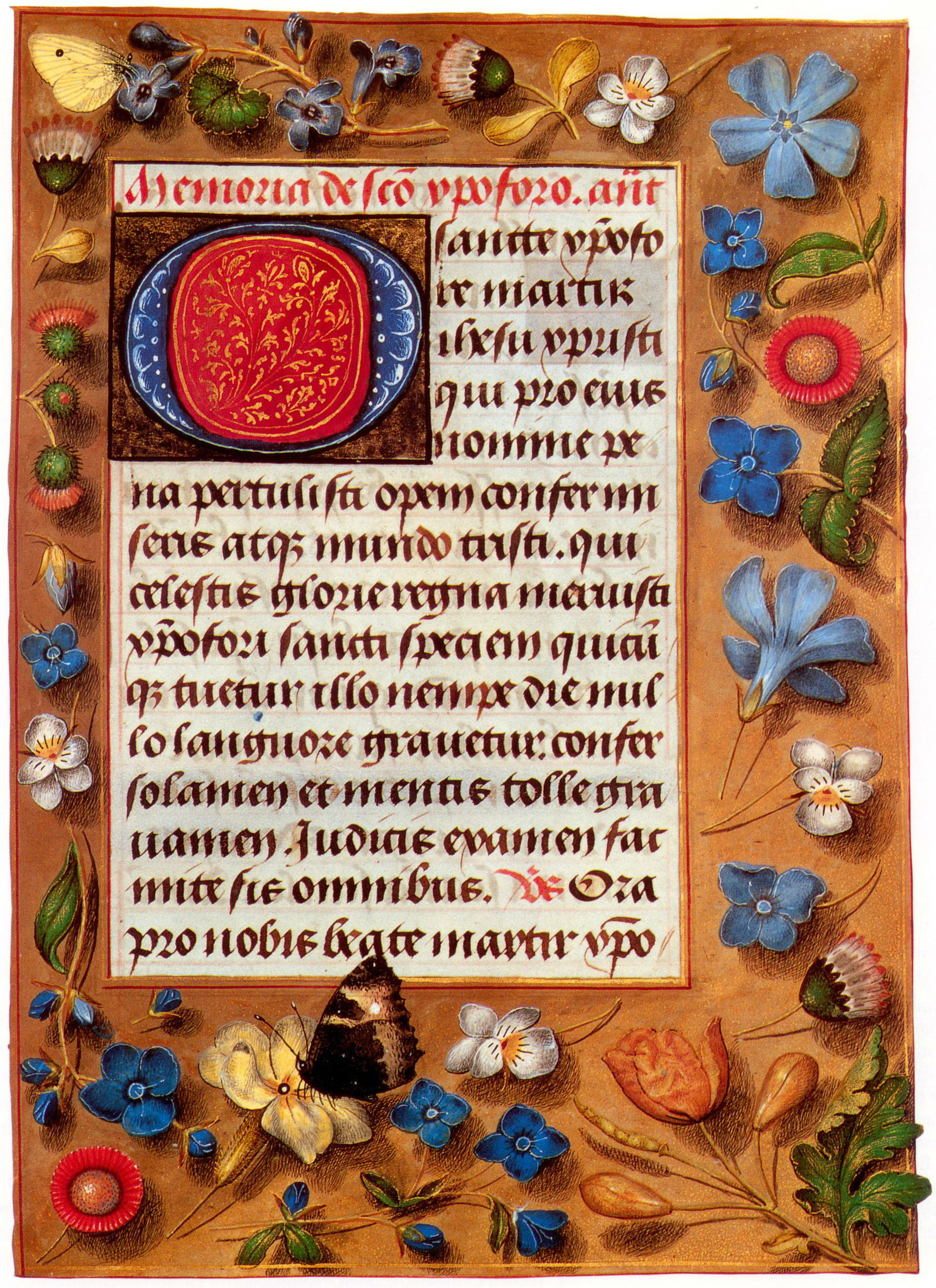
The lavish illusionistic borders of this Flemish book of hours from the late 1470s are typical of luxury books of this period, which were now often decorated on every page. The butterfly wing cutting into the text area is an example of playing with visual conventions, typical of the period. (Among the plants are the Veronica, Vinca, Viola tricolor, Bellis perennis, and Chelidonium majus. The lower butterfly is Aglais urticae, the top left butterfly is Pieris rapae. The Latin text is a devotion to Saint Christopher).

In the 14th century the book of hours overtook the psalter as the most common vehicle for lavish illumination. This partly reflected the increasing dominance of illumination both commissioned and executed by laymen rather than monastic clergy. From the late 14th century a number of bibliophile royal figures began to collect luxury illuminated manuscripts for their decorations, a fashion that spread across Europe from the Valois courts of France and the Burgundy, as well as Prague under Charles IV, Holy Roman Emperor and later Wenceslaus. A generation later, Duke Philip the Good of Burgundy was the most important collector of manuscripts, with several of his circle also collecting. It was during this period that the Flemish cities overtook Paris as the leading force in illumination, a position they retained until the terminal decline of the illuminated manuscript in the early 16th century.

The most famous collector of all, the French prince John, Duke of Berry (1340–1416) owned several books of hours, some of which survive, including the most celebrated of all, the Très Riches Heures du Duc de Berry. This was begun around 1410 by the Limbourg brothers, although left incomplete by them, and decoration continued over several decades by other artists and owners. The same was true of the Turin-Milan Hours, which also passed through Berry's ownership.

By the mid-15th century, a much wider group of nobility and rich businesspeople were able to commission highly decorated, often small, books of hours. With the arrival of printing, the market contracted sharply, and by 1500 the finest quality books were once again being produced only for royal or very grand collectors. One of the last major illuminated book of hours was the Farnese Hours completed for the Roman Cardinal Alessandro Farnese in 1546 by Giulio Clovio, who was also the last major manuscript illuminator.

== Gallery ==
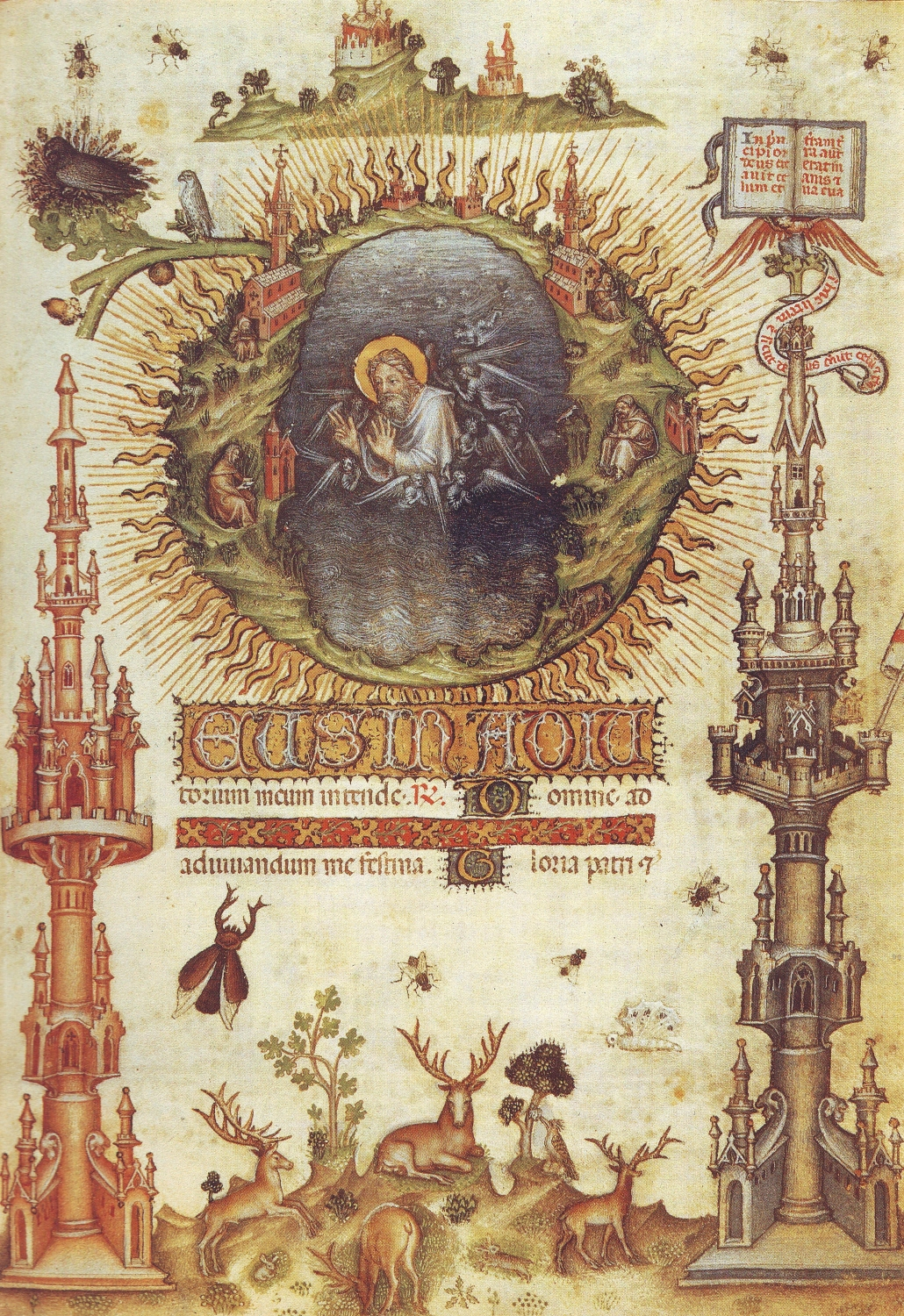
The Visconti Hours

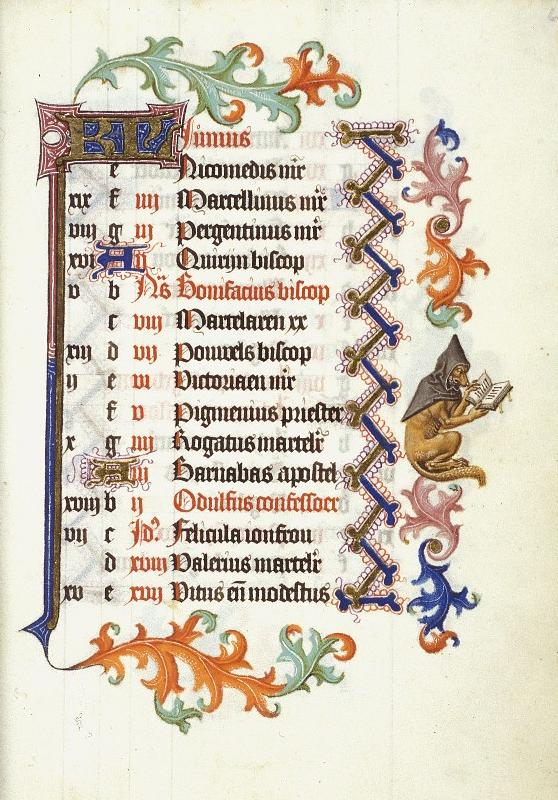
Calendar page from the Hours of Catherine of Cleves for June 1–15.

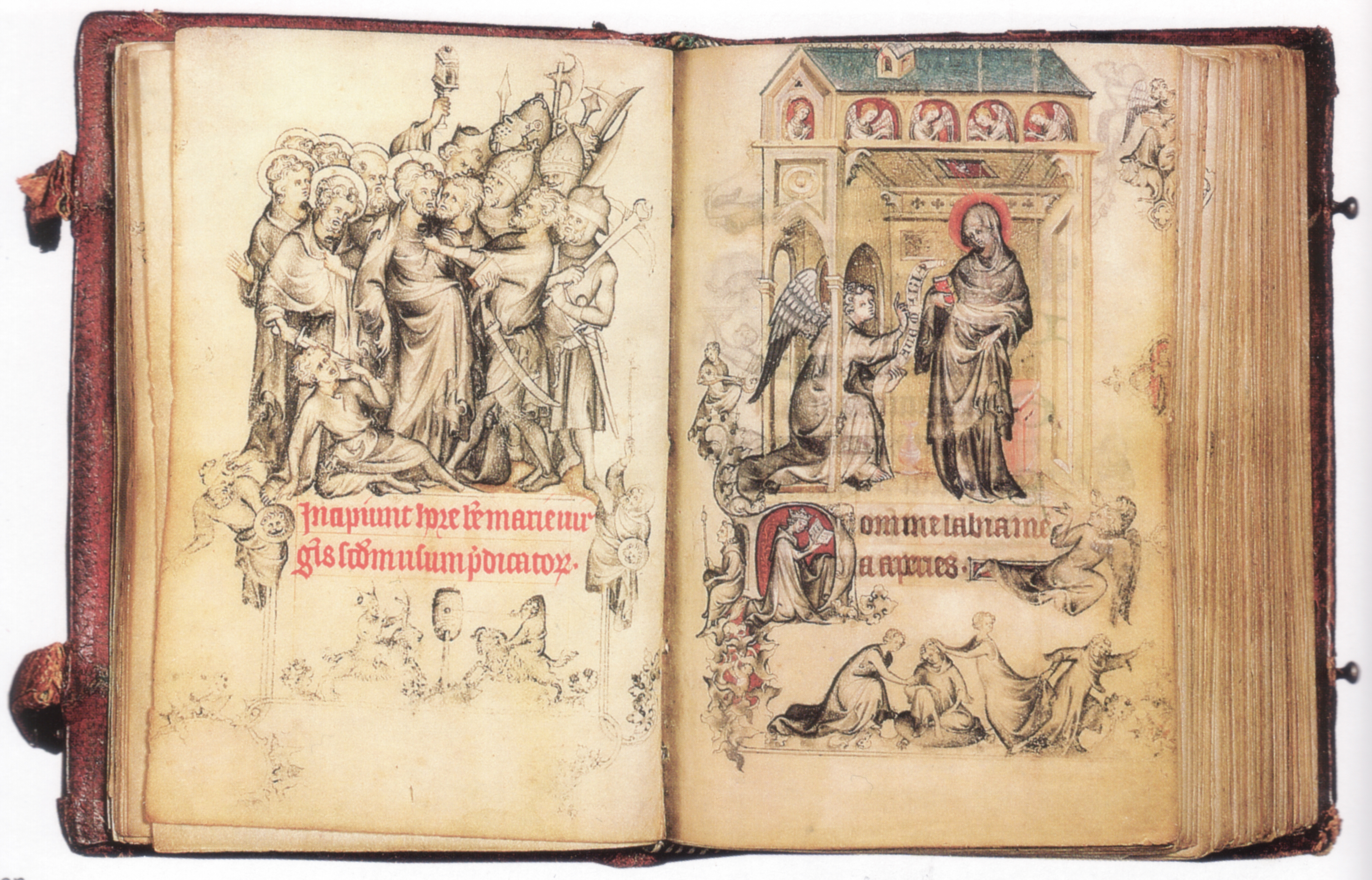
Book of Hours of Jeanne d'Evreux: Arrest of Jesus and Annunciation

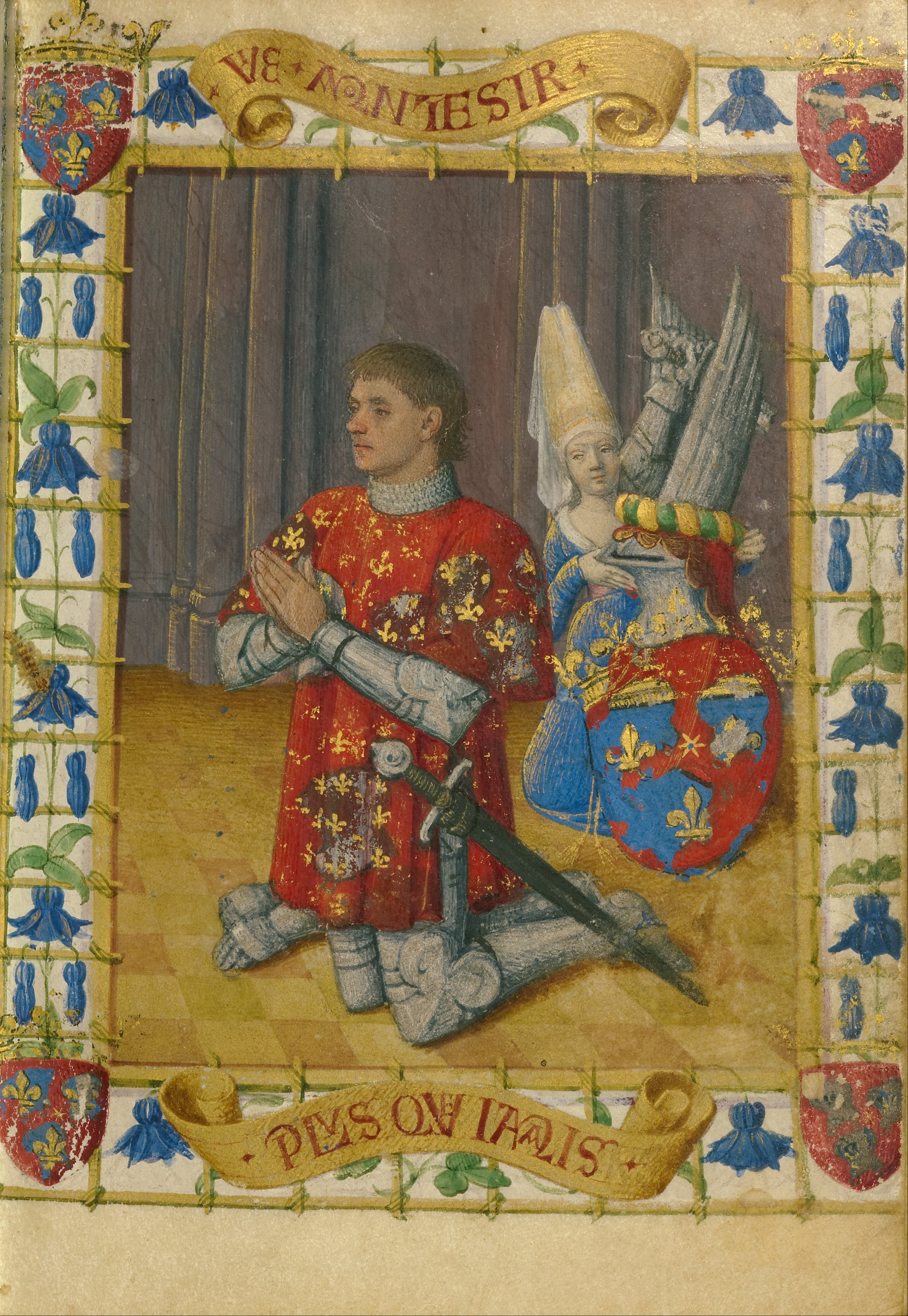
Book of hours of Simone de Varie, portrait of the owner and his wife

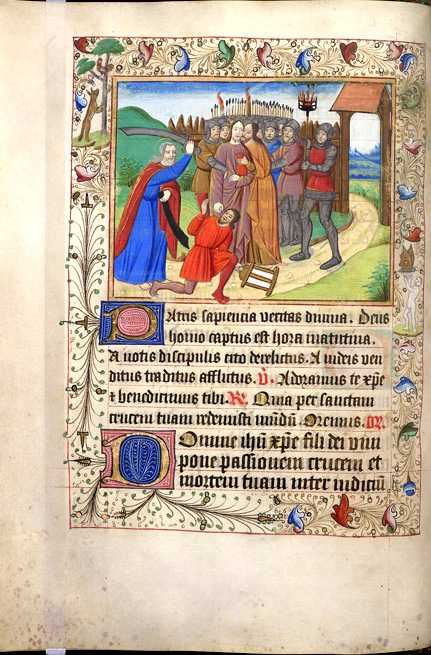
Book of Hours, British Library, the Arrest of Christ

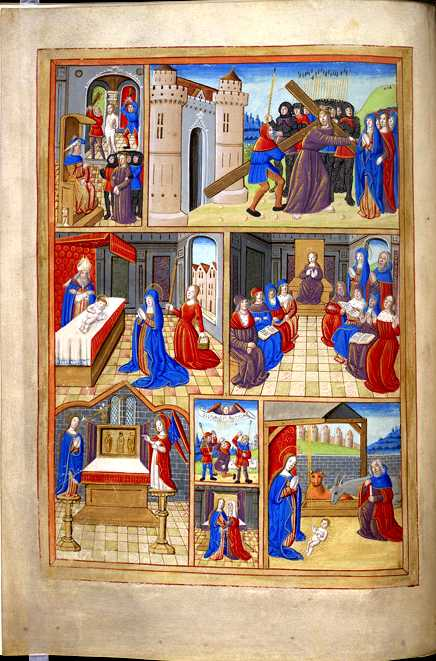
Scenes from the Life of Christ and Life of the Virgin in the same book

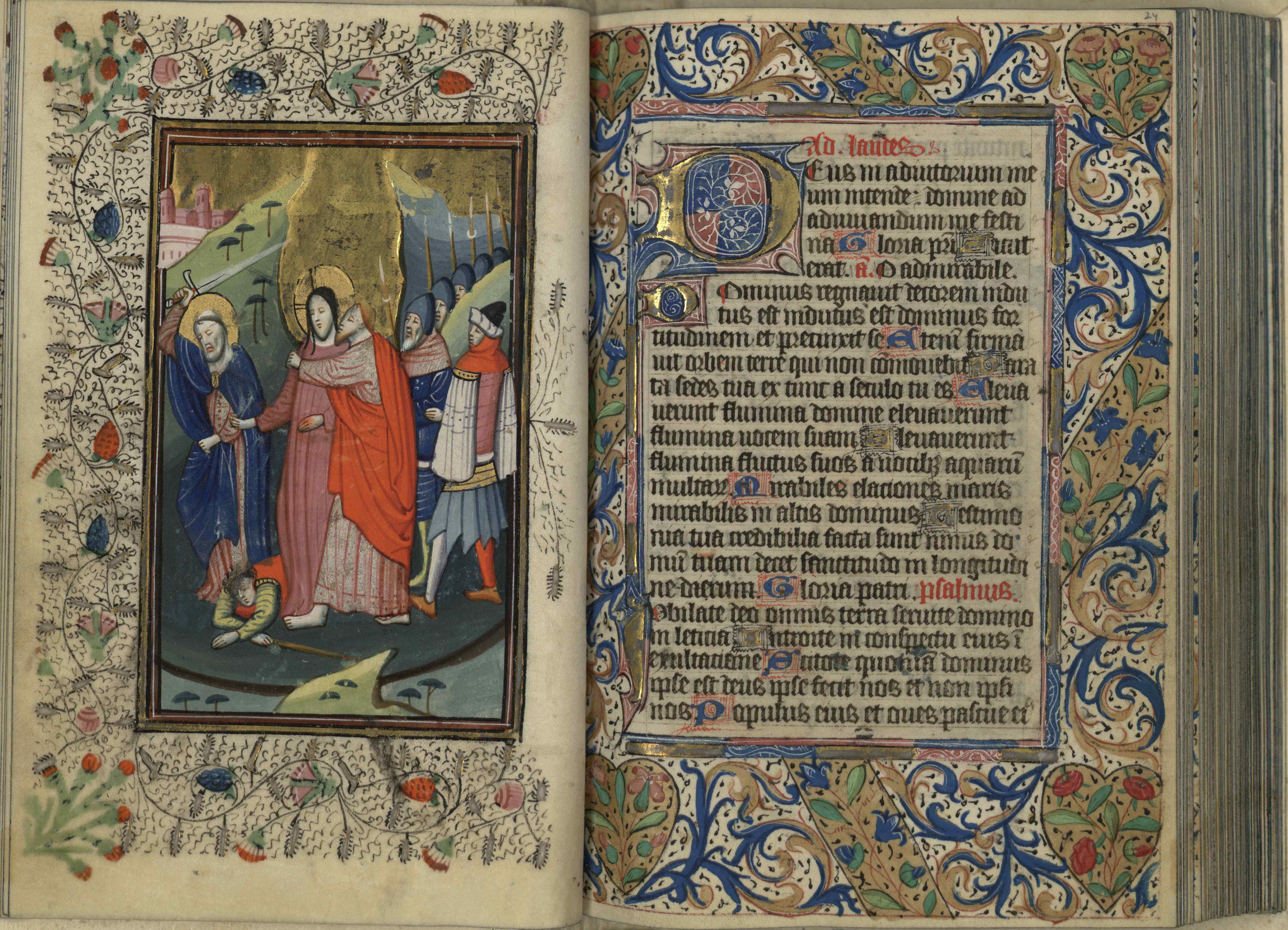
Book of Hours, 1420-1450, Bruges, from the collections of the National Library of Israel

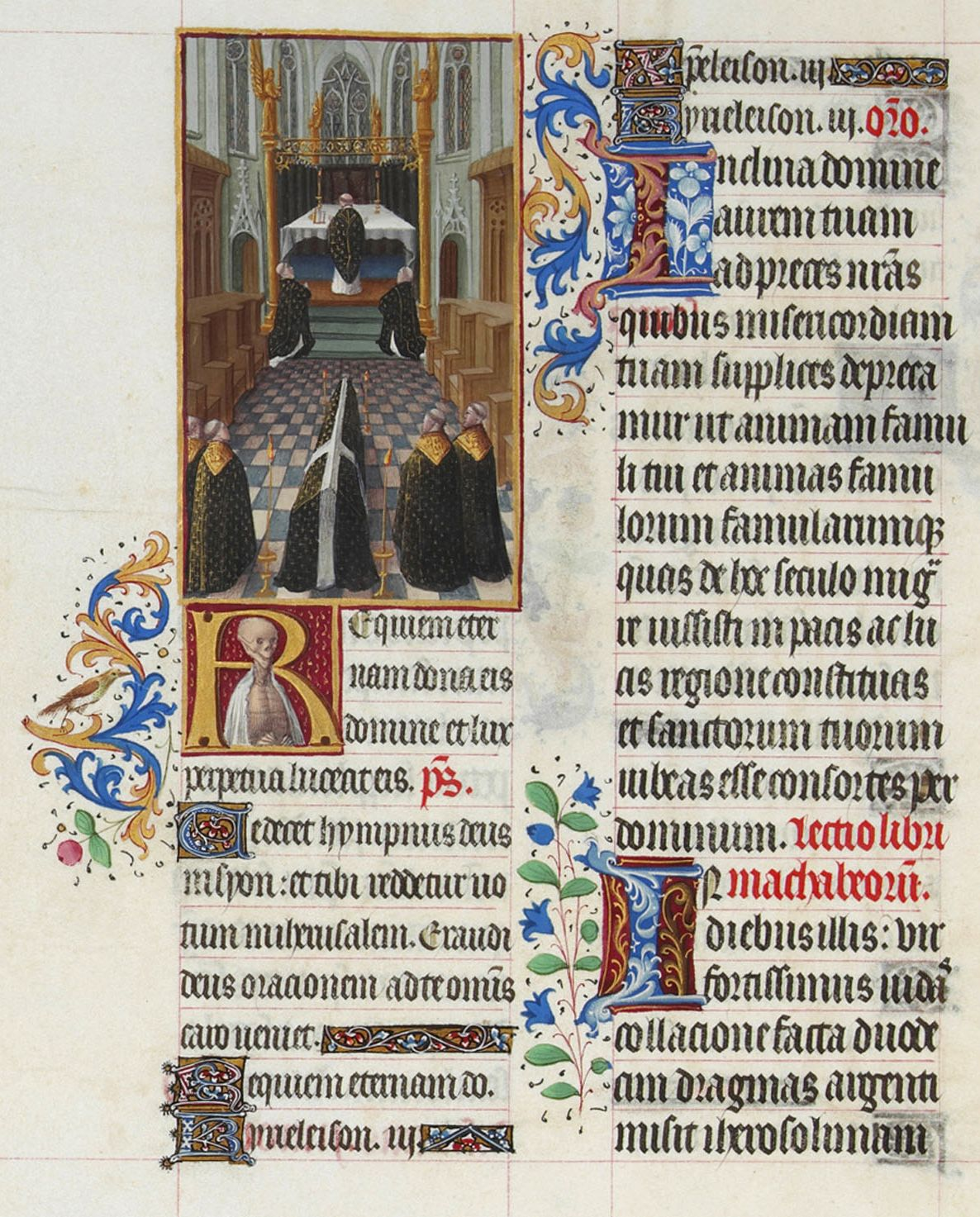
Les Très Riches Heures
du duc de Berry
A Funeral Service

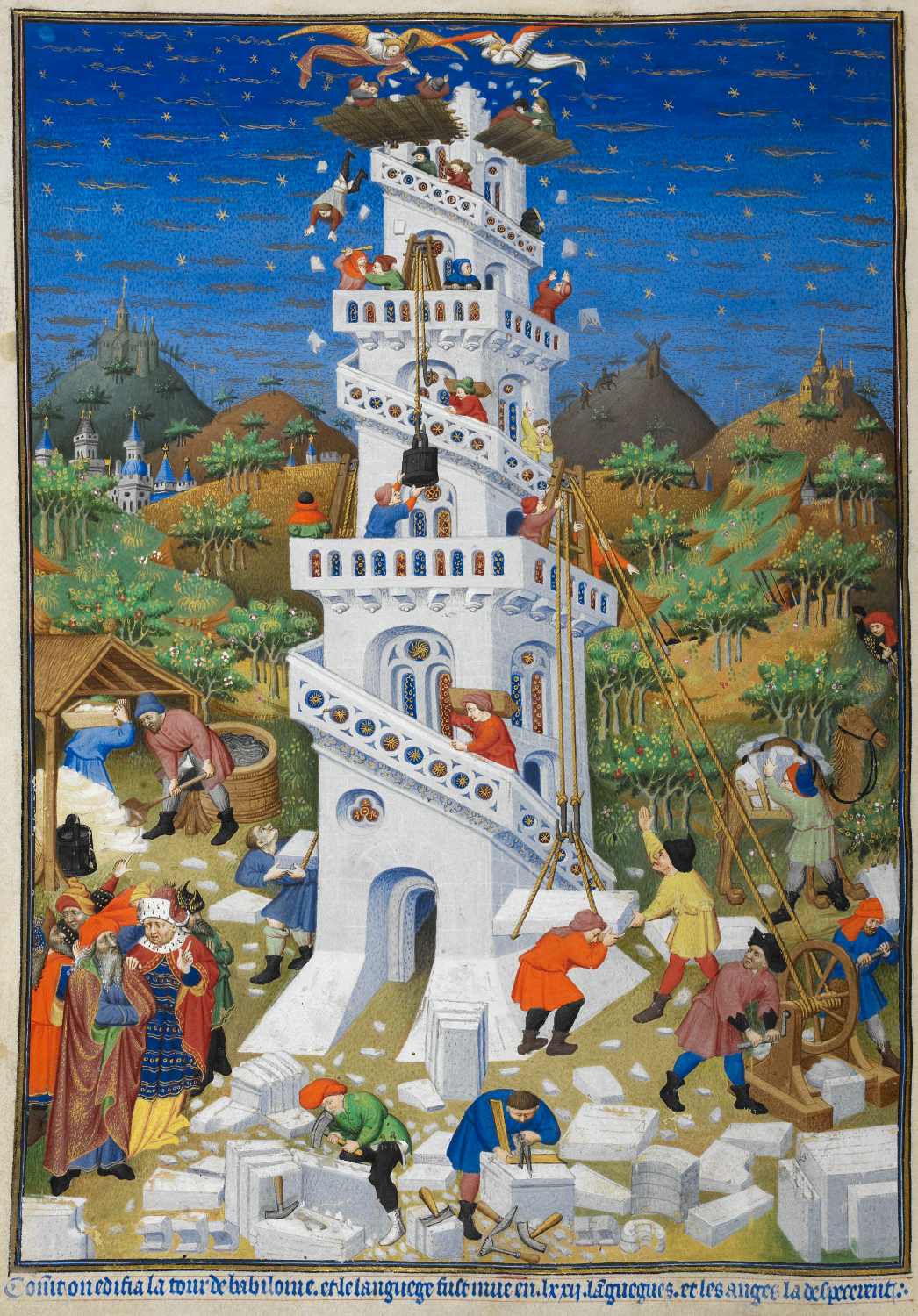
Bedford Hours; building the Tower of Babel

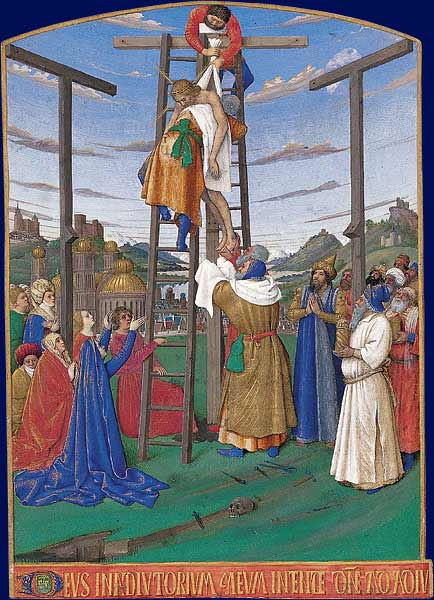
Book of Hours of
Étienne Chevalier:
Deposition by
Jean Fouquet

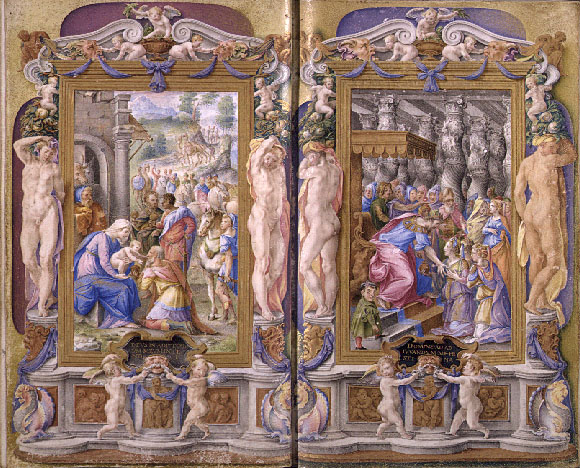
Farnese Hours:
Adoration of the Magi
and Solomon Adored
by the Queen of Sheba

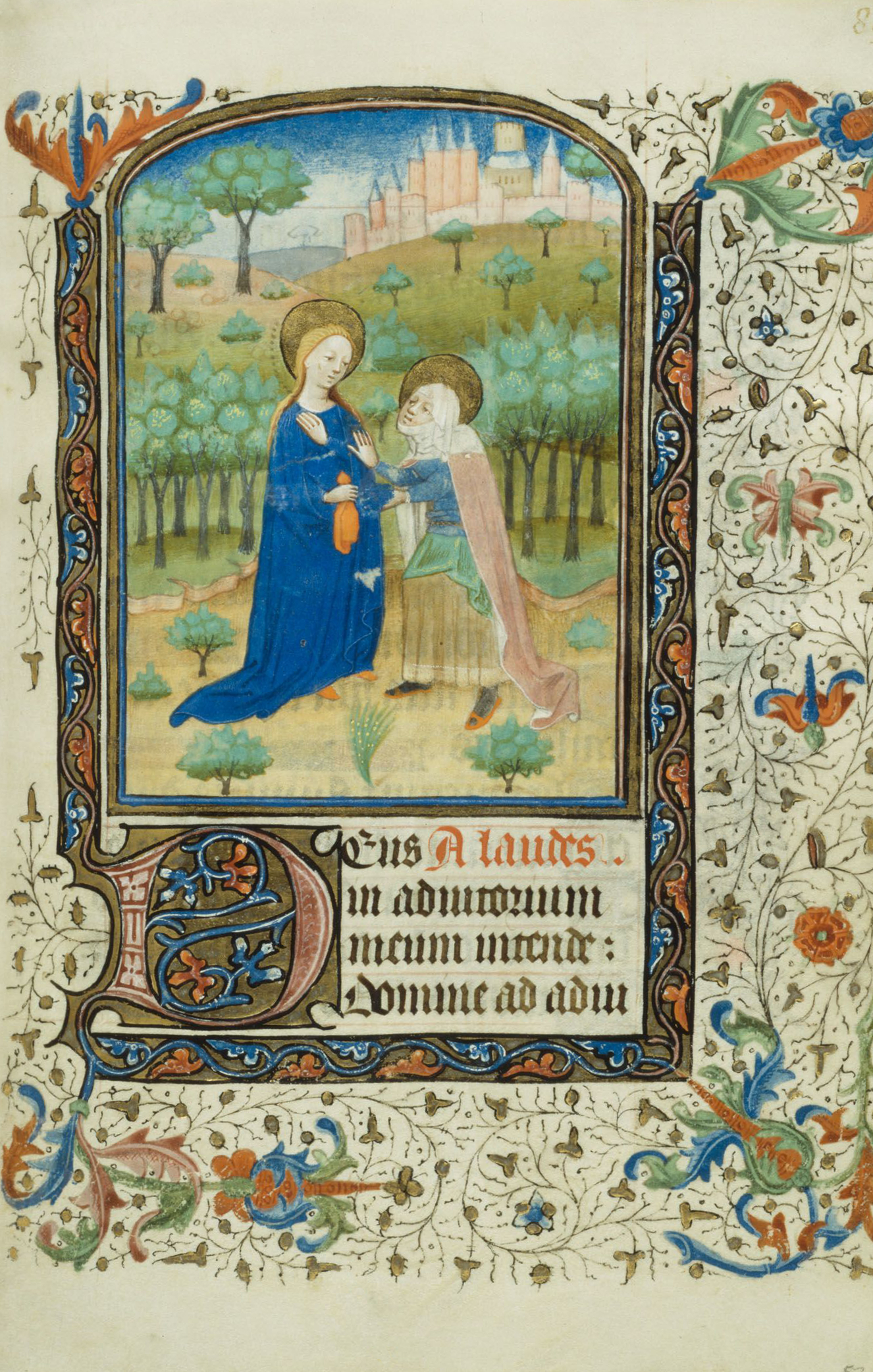
The Visitation, 1440–45

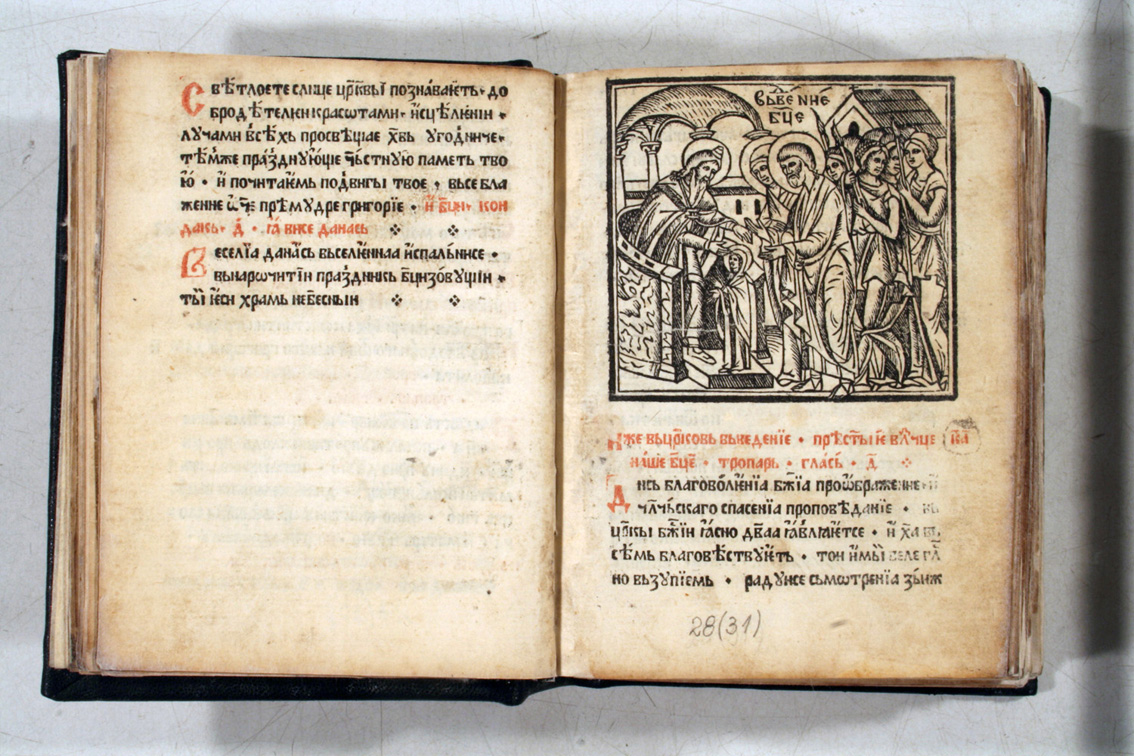
Printed Serbian book of hours, 1566

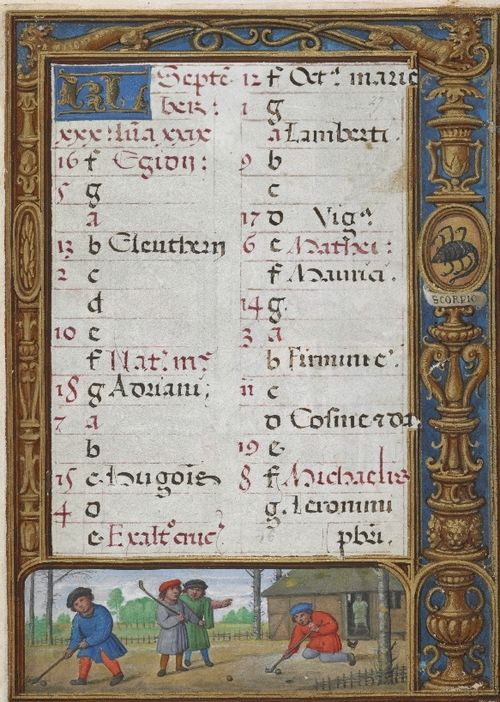
The Golf book c.1540
by Simon Bening in the British Library

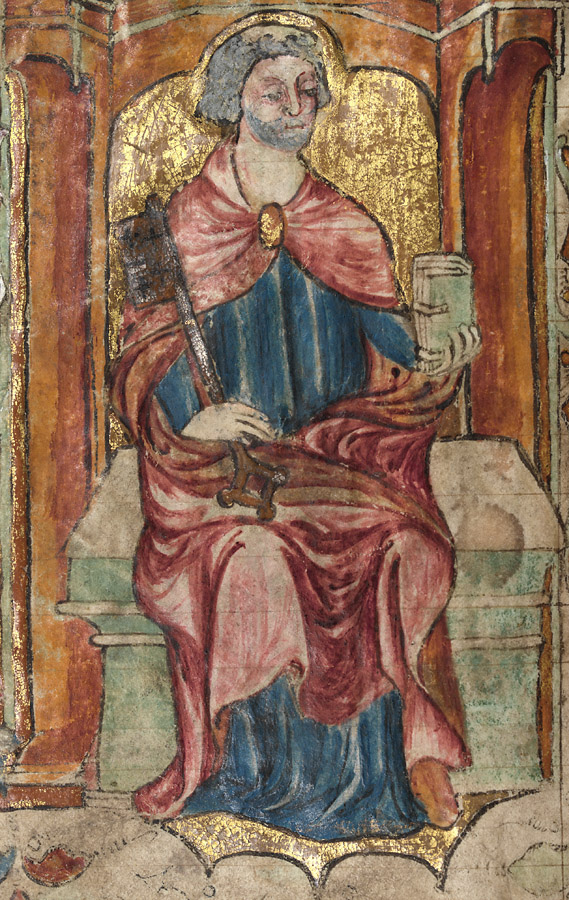
Llanbeblig Hours. St. Peter, holding a key and a book

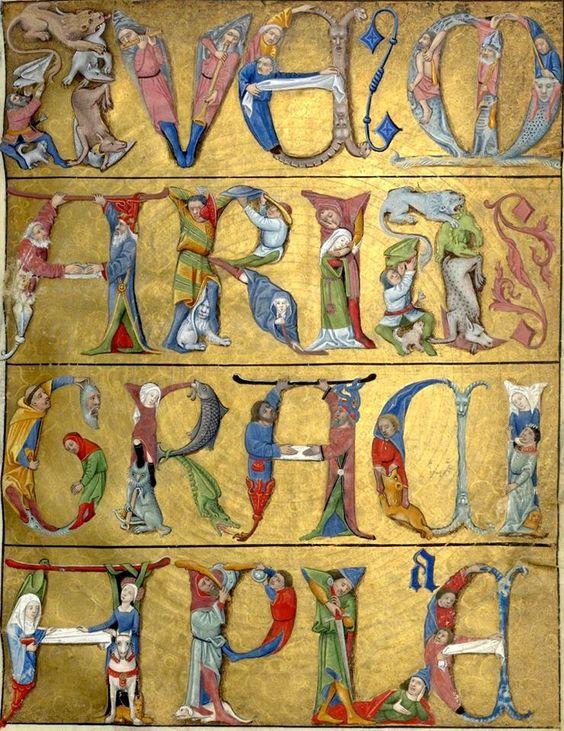
The beginning of Ave Maria in historiated letters in Heures de Charles d'Angoulême

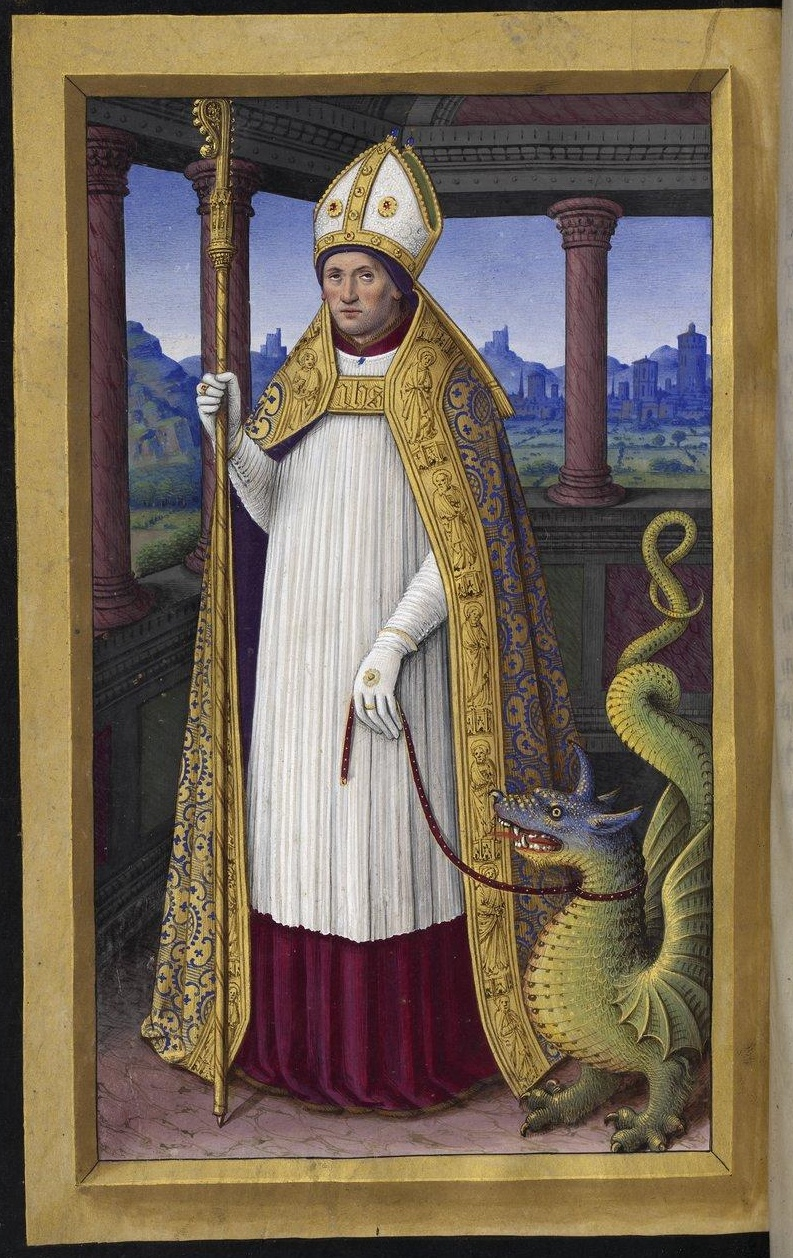
Saint Lifard with a dragon in the Grandes Heures of Anne of Brittany by Jean Bourdichon

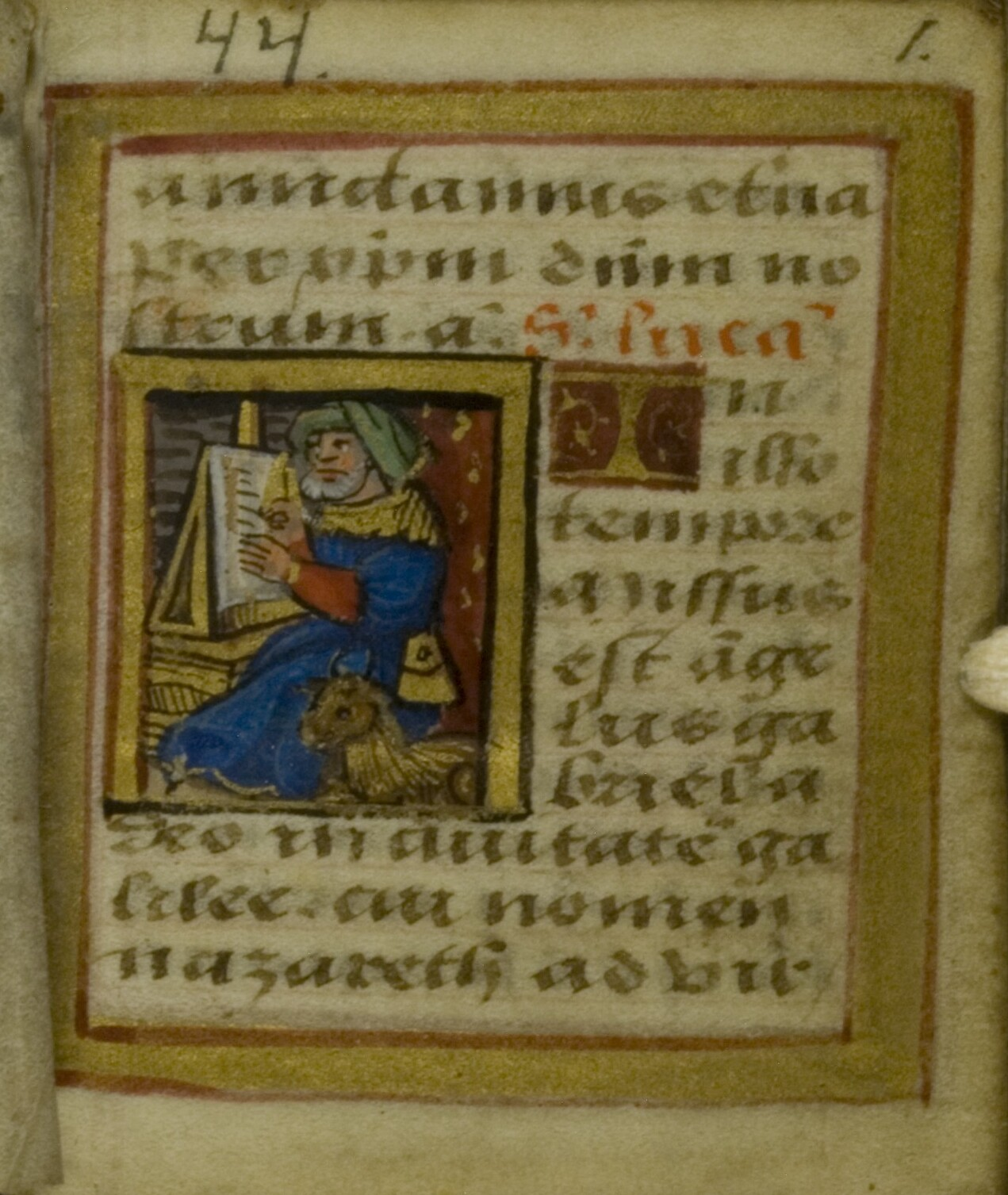
French thumb-sized miniature prayer book from the collection of National Library of Poland

Illumination of the Annunciation in a french book of hours from the 15th century.

== Selected examples ==
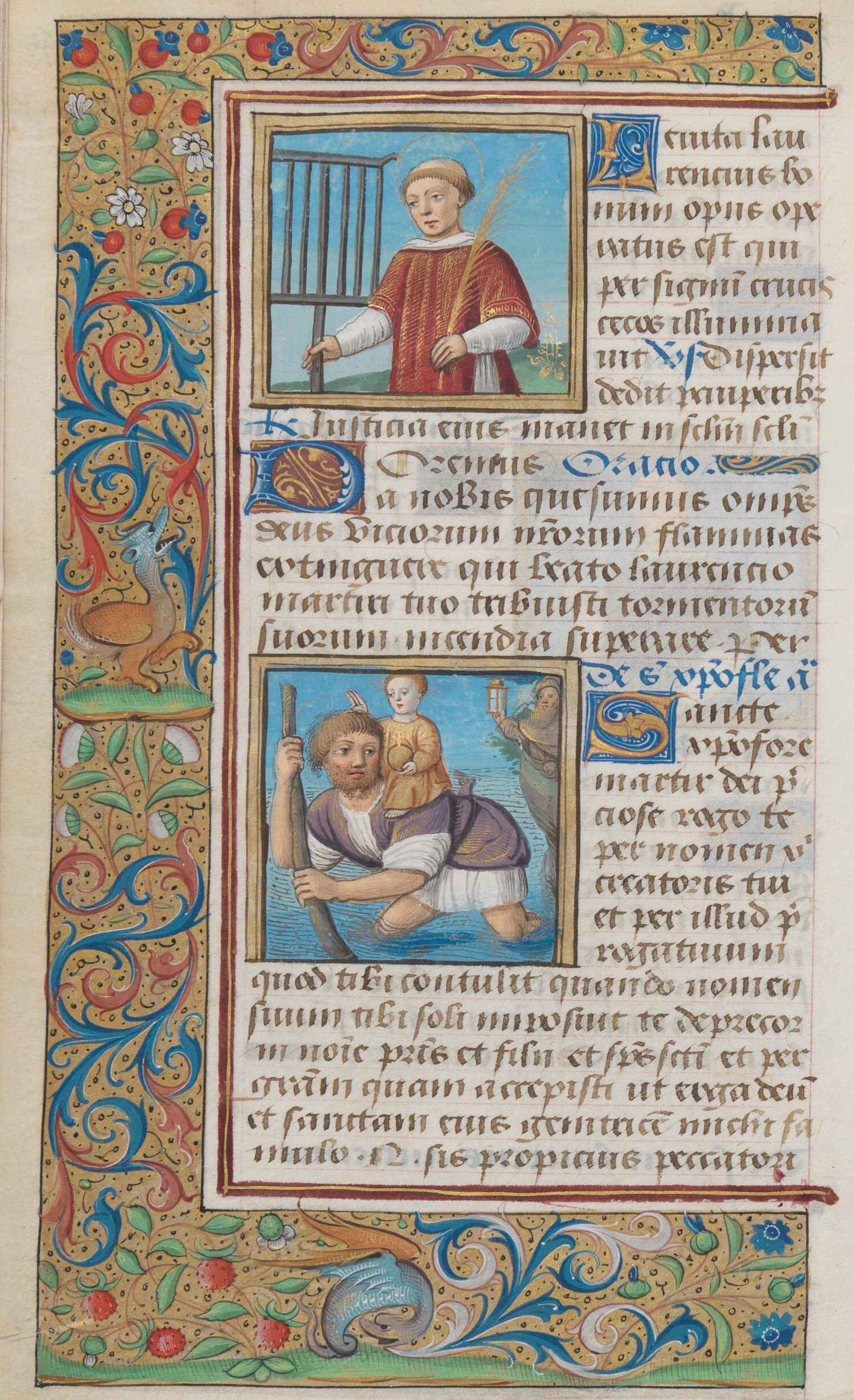
Example of a French-Latin book of hours. The miniatures have didactical purposes. Excerpt from the Book of Hours of Alexandre Petau. Made in the 16th century, Rouen.

See Category:Illuminated books of hours for a fuller list

=== In Europe ===
- Bedford Hours (c.1410–1430): London, British Library, Add. MS 18850
- Belles Heures of Jean de France, Duc de Berry (c.1405–1408/1409): Metropolitan Museum of Art, Cloisters Collection, 54.1.1a, b
- Black Hours of Galeazzo Maria Sforza (c.1466–1477): Vienna, Austrian National Library, Codex Vindobon. 1856
- Book of Hours (15th century): Milan, Biblioteca Trivulziana, Cod. 470
- Book of Hours (15th century): Paris, Bibliothèque nationale, MS lat. 10536 — one of the few early cordiform manuscripts still extant
- Book of Hours of Frederick of Aragon (1501–1502): Paris, Bibliothèque nationale, MS Lat. 10532
- Book of Hours of Queen Bona (c. 1527–1528): Bodleian Library — created by the Polish Renaissance painter and illuminator Stanisław Samostrzelnik and his collaborators. The manuscript was intended for Queen Bona of the Sforza family – the second wife of Sigismund I the Old.
- Cobden Book of Hours: Bristol University Special Collections
- Grandes Heures of Anne of Brittany (1503–1508): Paris, Bibliothèque nationale, MS lat. 9474
- Hours of Étienne Chevalier (1450s) — sheets in several libraries
- Hours of Gian Galeazzo Visconti (late 14th century): Florence, Biblioteca Nazionale, Banco Rari 397 and Landau-Finaly 22
- Hours of James IV of Scotland (c.1503): Austrian National Library, Codex Vindobon. 1897
- Hours of Philip the Bold (late 14th century): Cambridge, Fitzwilliam Museum, MS 3-1954
- Howard Psalter and Hours (1310–1320): London, British Library, Arundel MS 83, pt 1
- Llanbeblig Book of Hours (1390–1400): Aberystwyth, National Library of Wales, NLW MS 17520A
- Petites Heures du Duc de Berry (1375×1385–1390): Paris, Royal Library, MS lat. 18014
- Primer of Claude of France (1505): Cambridge, Fitzwilliam Museum, MS 294 — simplified for a young princess
- Ravenelle Hours (15th century): Uppsala, UUB, MS C517e — a typical representative of books of hours made in Paris
- Rohan Hours (1430s): Paris, Bibliothèque nationale, MS lat. 9471
- Sforza Hours (commissioned c.1490, completed c.1517–1520): London, British Library, Add. MS 34294
- Taymouth Hours (c.1325–1335): London, British Library, Yates Thompson MS 13
- Très belles heures du Duc de Berry: Brussels, Royal Library of Belgium, 11060–11061
- Très belles heures de Notre-Dame du Duc de Berry: Paris, Bibliothèque nationale, nouv. acq. lat. 3093
- Très Riches Heures du Duc de Berry (c.1411–1416): Chantilly, Musée Condé, MS 65
- Turin-Milan Hours: Turin, City Museum of Ancient Art, MS Inv. 47
- 'The De Brailes Hours', formerly known as 'The Dyson Perrins Hours' (1240): London, British Library, Add. MS 49999

=== In the United States ===
- Belles Heures of Jean de France, Duc de Berry (c.1405–1408/9): New York, Metropolitan Museum of Art, The Cloisters, 54.1.1a, b — miniatures of 'the Limburg Brothers'
- Black Hours (1460–1475): New York, Morgan Library, Morgan MS 493 — an example of Black Hours, codices copied on black pages
- Farnese Hours (1546): New York, Morgan Library, MS M.69 — illuminated by Giulio Clovio
- Hours of Catherine of Cleves, property of 'Katharina van Kleef' (15th century): New York, Morgan Library, MSS M.917 and M.945
- Hours of Henry VIII: New York, Morgan Library, MS H.8 — with miniatures by Jean Poyer
- Hours of Jeanne d'Evreux (1325–1328): New York, Metropolitan Museum of Art, The Cloisters, 54.1.2

=== In Australia ===
- Rothschild Prayerbook (c.1500–1520): on display at the National Library of Australia in Canberra, owned by Australian businessman Kerry Stokes.

== See also ==
- Agpeya
- Black books of hours
- Divine Service (Eastern Orthodoxy) and Horologion
- Grey-FitzPayn Hours
- Hours of Angers
- Hours of Charles V
- Hours of John the Fearless
- Hours of Peter II
- Liturgy of the Hours
