= Llanbeblig Book of Hours =

14th-century illuminated manuscript

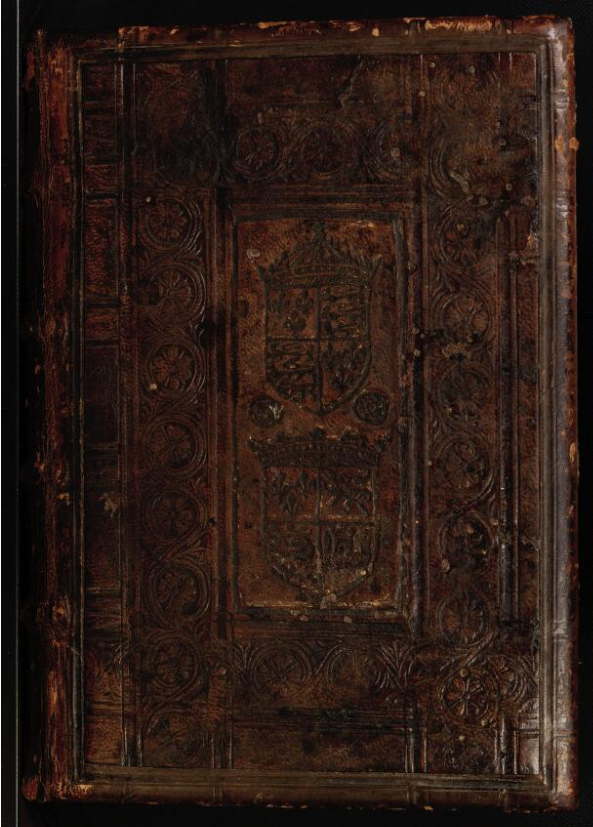
The 16th century gold tooled covers of the Llanbeblig Hours.

The Llanbeblig Book of Hours is an illuminated manuscript in the National Library of Wales (NLW MS 17520A) that dates from the close of the fourteenth century.

The book of hours has pages for daily medieval Christian devotion and a Calendar of key religious dates that link the Llanbeblig Hours to Wales. More specifically the dedication of the church of Saint Peblig, which is marked on 6 June in the calendar, connects it with Caernarfon in North Wales. The calendar is written in a different hand to the rest of the book and uses black and red ink. It follows the Sarum Use of medieval religious calendars which allowed the feasts of local saints to be included alongside more widely recognised saints feast days. The calendar features Welsh saints' feast days, including St. David (1 March), St. Peblig (3 July) and St. Deiniol of Bangor (11 September.

The creation of the manuscript is thought to date from the last decade of the fourteenth century and it was initially owned by a woman called Isabella Godynogh. She died in 1413 and her obituary was added into the book of hours Calendar at 23 April.

A rare Lily Crucifixion motif is one of the seven illuminated miniatures in this Book of Hours and is considered unique in its use in manuscript form. The Lily Crucifixion miniature is discussed in the context of other examples of the motif in devotional iconography in an NLW journal article by Eddie Duggan. Although neither the miniatures nor the decorated borders and initial letters are not considered to be of great artistic merit, this manuscript is of interest as it is one of the few examples of a surviving illuminated manuscript that is linked to Wales.

== Binding ==
The early sixteenth century gold-tooled calf covers of the Llanbeblig Hours, which both bear the arms of King Henry VIII and Queen Catherine of Aragon in shields separated by two roses, are inlaid in the nineteenth century binding. The binding was thus executed before the 1532 annulment of King Henry's marriage to Katherine of Aragon.

== Full-page miniatures ==
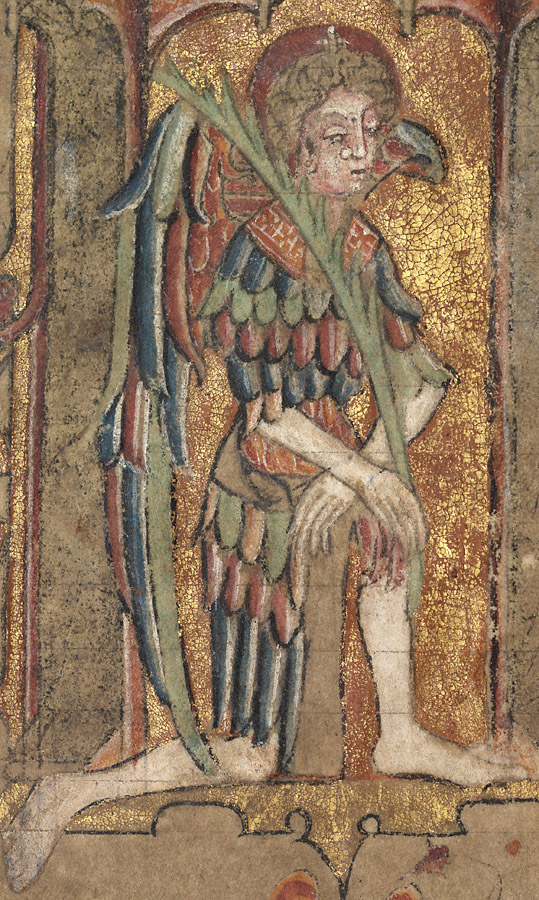
Folio 1r. The Annunciation.

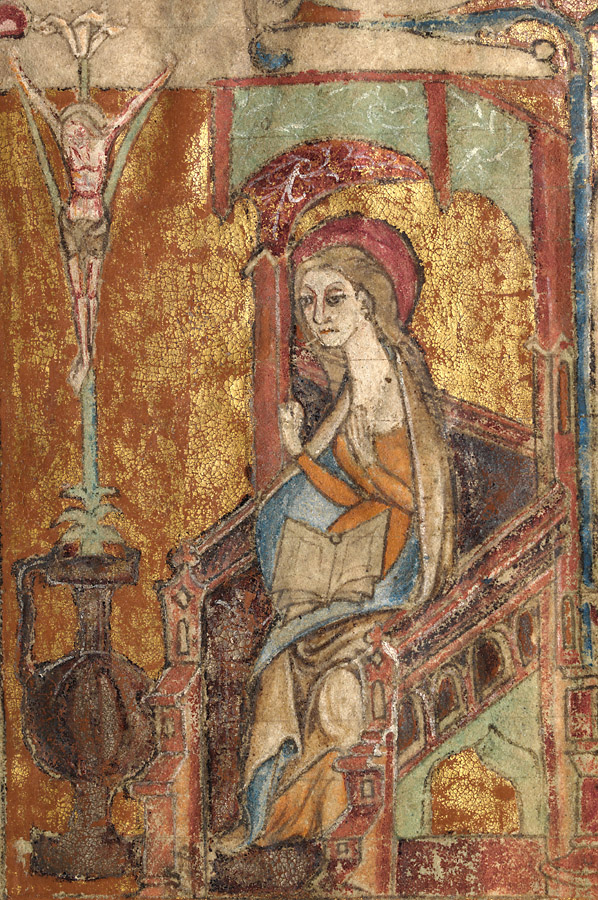
Folio 2r. The Lily Crucifixion.

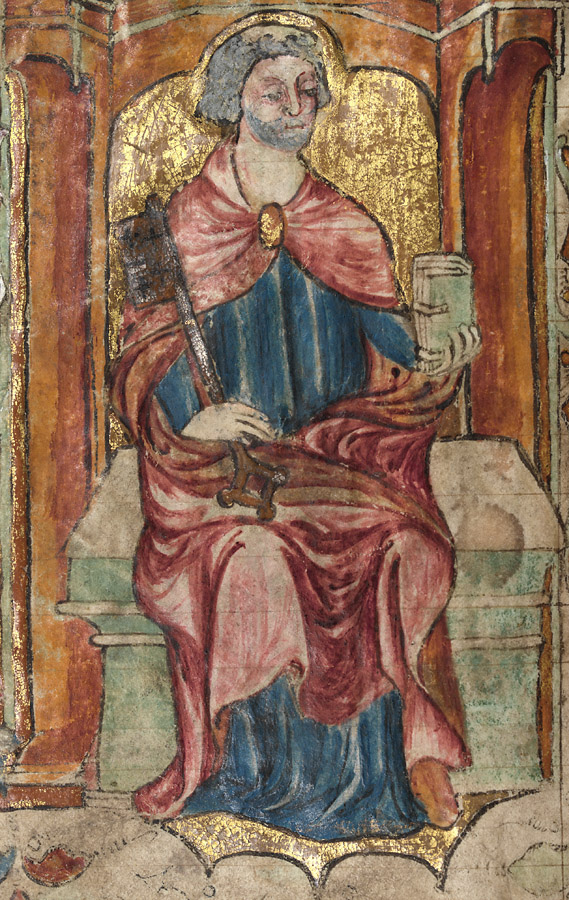
Folio 2v. St. Peter, holding a key and a book.

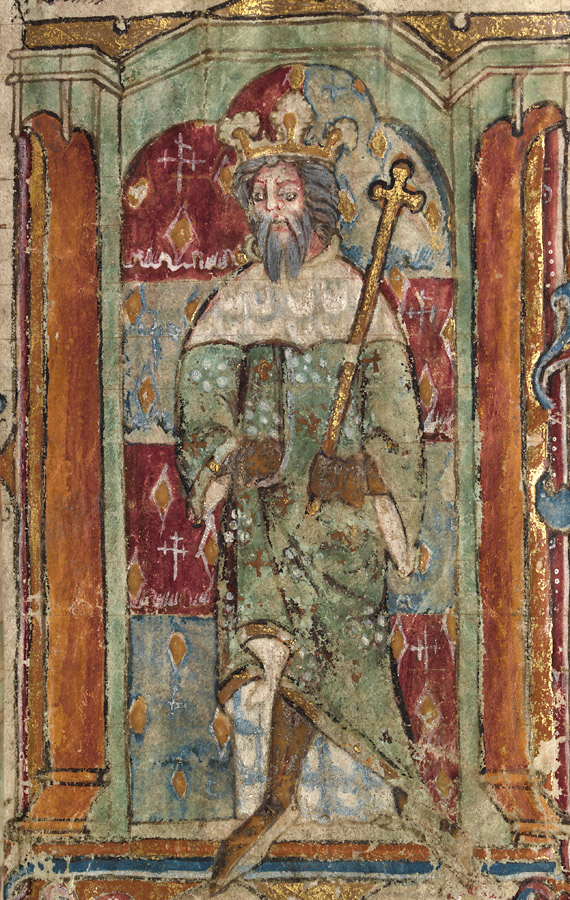
Folio 3r. A king, possibly Magnus Maximus, holding a sceptre.

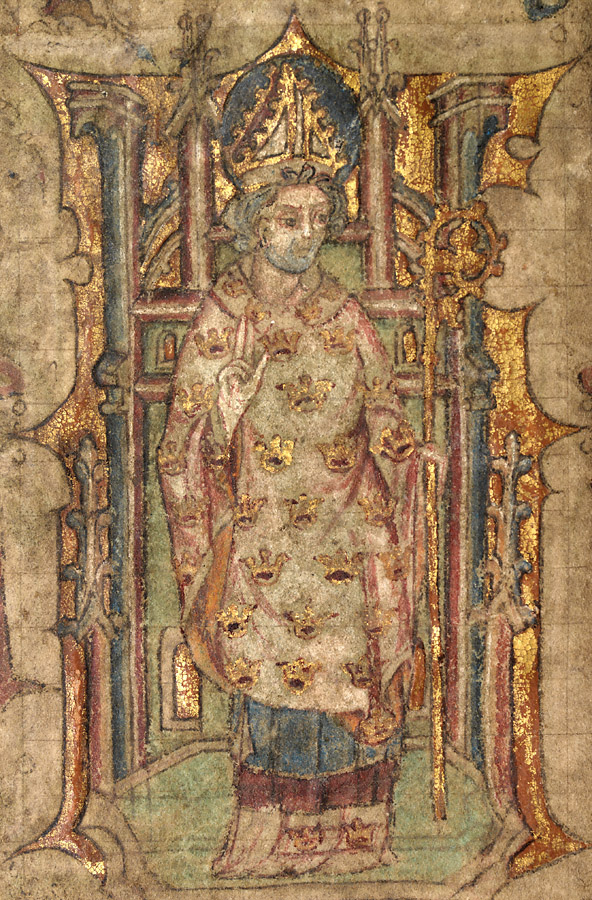
Folio 3v. A bishop, possibly St.Peblig, blessing and wearing a mitre, and holding a crosier.

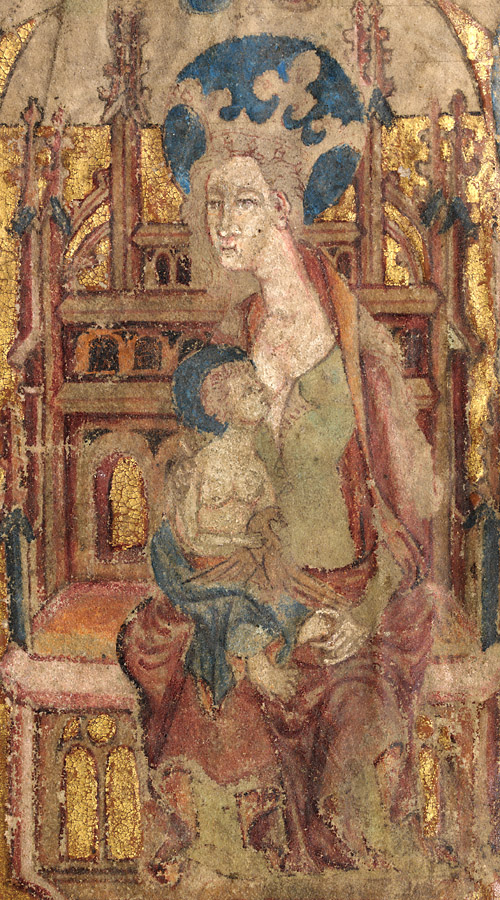
Folio 4r. Madonna and Child.

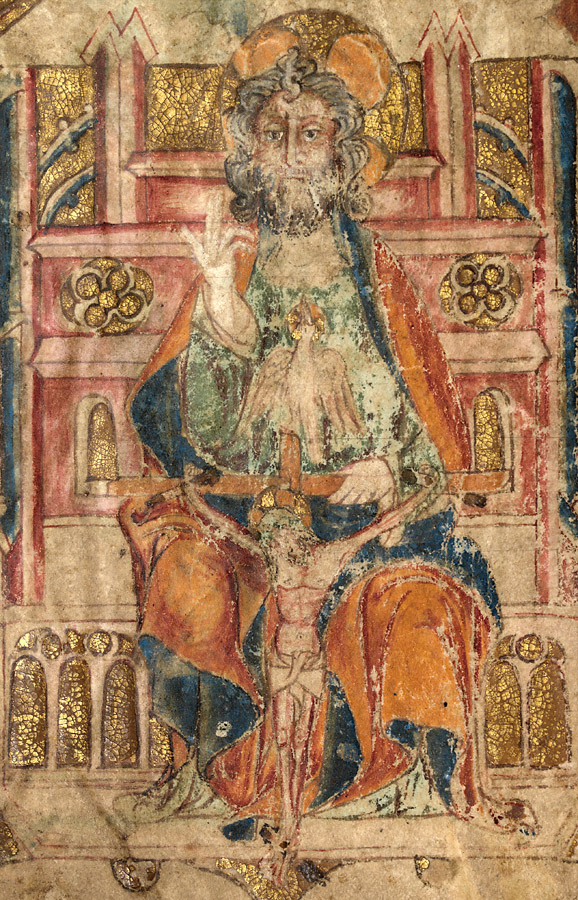
Folio 4v. God, The Holy Spirit, and Christ Crucified.
