= Hours of Angers =

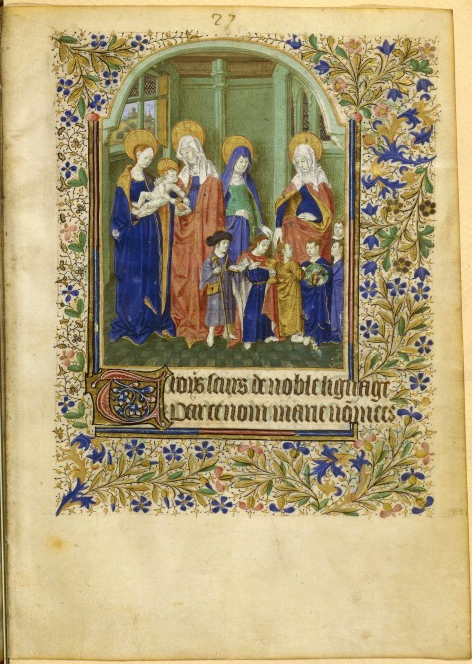
A page from the book

The Hours of Angers or Hours for the Angers usage is a type of medieval book of Hours. It is used to follow the rite of the canonical hours as practised in Anjou in general and Angers in particular. Examples are held by the Bodleian Library, as well as the Bibliothèque nationale de France and the Fitzwilliam Museum.

In 2005, a copy was offered for sale at an auction in Epernay; the book was described as being created in 1510, originally decorated with twelve paintings.

In 2005, a copy was offered for sale at Sotheby’s in London, with an estimated value of £1,800.; three years later another copy was offered for sale with an estimated value of £20,000. By 2025, a copy could cost over £39,000, or 47,000 euros.

== See also ==
- Text Manuscripts website Book of Hours (Use of Angers)
