= BnF, MS lat. 10536 =

15th-century Book of Hours

- Paris, Bibliothèque nationale de France, MS Latin 10536
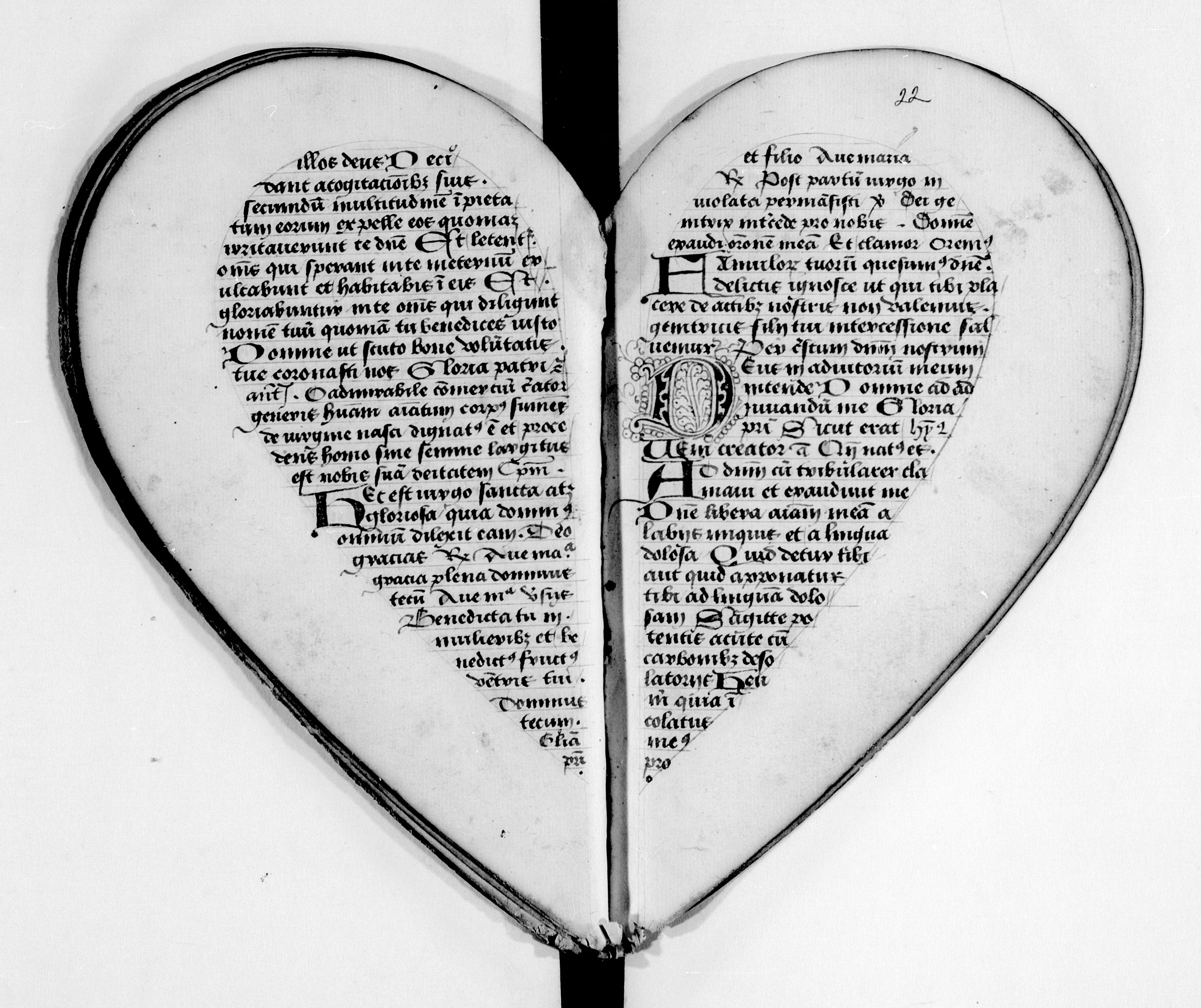
- BnF, MS lat. 10536, ff. 21v–22r
- Type: Book of Hours
- Date: 15th century
- Place of origin: France, Picardy, (Amiens?)
- Language: Latin
- Material: Paper, ink
- Size: 151 ff.; 175 × 100 mm
- Format: Cordiform
- Illumination(s): Initials, some with penwork

BnF, MS lat. 10536 is a Book of Hours held in Paris’ Bibliothèque nationale de France. Produced in Picardy in the 15th century, the codex is notable for being one of a small handful of extant early cordiform (heart-shaped) manuscript books.

== Description ==
Copied on paper, and measuring approximately 175 × 100 mm, the 151 folio codex contains a calendar (ff. 1r–8r), followed by the Hours of the Use of Amiens, the likely place of its production. Written in Latin, the text is ornamented with enlarged initials, some decorated with penwork. The codex is bound in red Morocco stamped with the arms of Philippe de Béthune.

== Provenance ==
The Bibliothèque nationale de France purchased the book from M. de Bure, bookseller, in 1824. The sale of the collection of the famous Parisian bookseller and bibliophile Charles Chardin took place in February and March of that year at Hôtel Bullion, Paris; the manuscript had been lot number 155 in the sale.

== See also ==
- Book of Hours
- Chansonnier Cordiforme
- Heart Book
