= Hours of Philip the Bold =

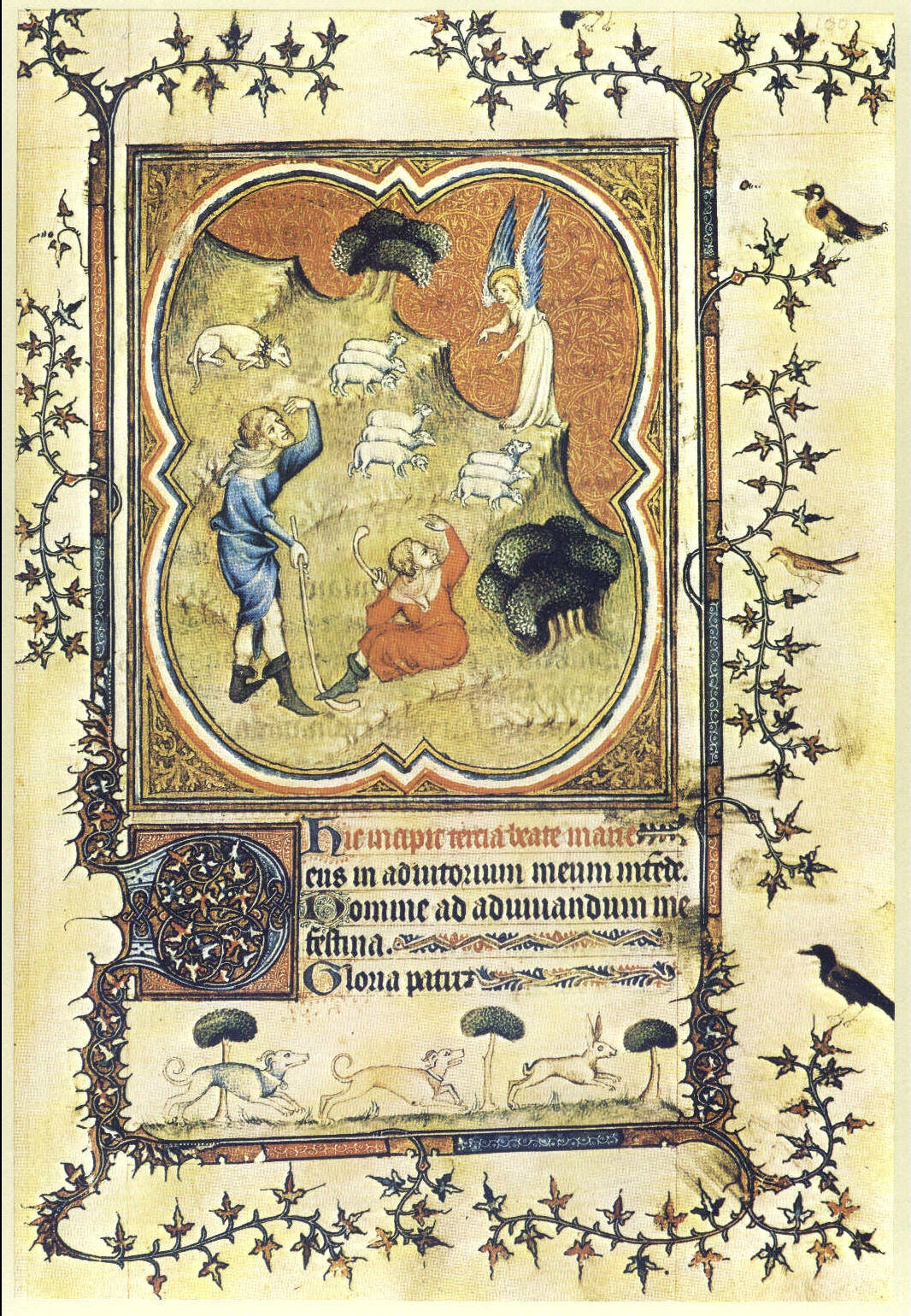
- Nativity, Folio 97r, Fitzwilliam Museum
- Patron: Philip the Bold
- Date: 14th century
- Manuscript(s): MS. 3-1954
- Genre: Book of Hours

The Hours of Philip the Bold is a late 14th-century illuminated book of hours produced in Paris for Philip the Bold, Duke of Burgundy (1363-1404). It contains illustrated calendars, figured initials and 11 large miniatures with ivy borders, following the Paris liturgy. The manuscript has a devotional use. Philip reportedly recited his daily prayers from this manuscript. His hours, which contains almost 200 images, is one of the most worldly manuscripts to survive from the library of the Burgundian Dukes. It is now MS. 3-1954 in the Fitzwilliam Museum, Cambridge.

== History ==
=== Commission ===
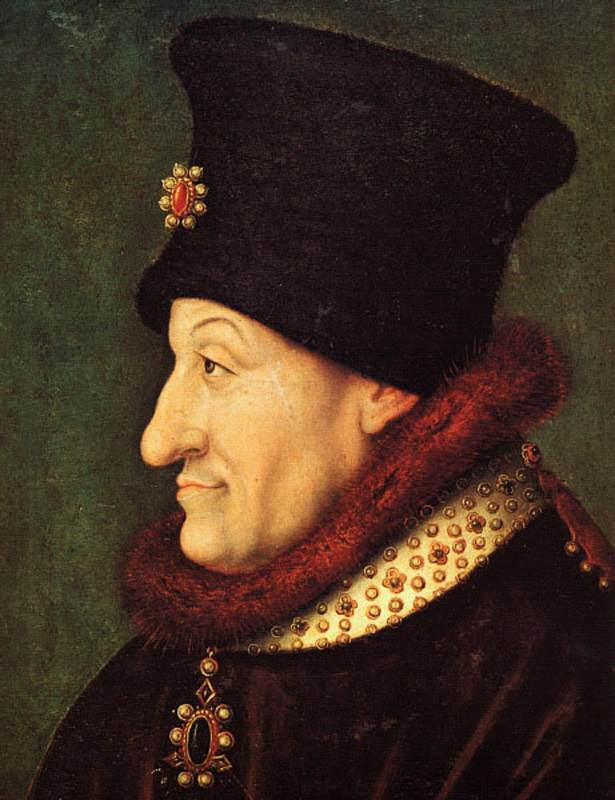
Philip the Bold, 16th century, oil on panel

Philip the Bold was the first of the four Valois Dukes of Burgundy. After inheriting territory from three generations of descendants, he controlled it from 1363 to 1404. Stylistic features of the manuscript show that it was made in Paris a few years after Philip became the Duke of Burgundy. The manuscript was largely produced in two stages. The first was commenced in 1376 by Philip the Bold and paid for in 1379, with a few supplementary texts and images added in 1390. Guillaume de Valen, Philip's confessor, left the production of the hours to artisans of the Parisian community who also worked for the Duke's brother, King Charles V of France. Manuscripts created by artisans rather than monks became a common model of manuscript production by the late medieval period. A second stage of the hours were completed in 1451 by Flemish artists for Philip's grandson and heir, Philip the Good (1419–67).

=== Artists ===
Artists involved in the creation of the hours include Master of the Bible of Jean de Sy (fr), Master of the Grandes Heures, Master of the Throne of Mercy, Master of the Coronation Book of Charles V with assistance from Willem Vrelant, Jean Le Tavernier, Dreux Jean (fr) and others. Flemish artist Alexander Bening is thought to have contributed to the hours in the fifteenth century. He was the first artist to illustrate borders with realistic depictions of flowers, jewels, and animals. Two artists are responsible for the miniatures of Philip's prayerbook. Eric Millar identified the likely artist who painted the calendar scenes and ten of the eleven large miniatures as the Boquetaux Master. However, another artist, possibly a close follower of the Boquetaux Master's circle, is also speculated to have painted the calendar scenes and ten of the eleven large miniatures. The second artist of the manuscript is less skillful, but they come from the same workshop. The Boquetaux Master's name derives from the grouped parasol-like trees which are a prominent element of his work. His bas-de-pages which consist of quadrilobed frames around the miniatures and little scenes painted at the bottom of the page are also distinguishable features of his work. The Annunciation to the Shepherds miniature displays examples of the Boquetaux Master's little spinneys or small thickets.

=== Provenance ===
In 1404, the Hours of Philip the Bold, a book of additional prayers and texts, and Philip's entire library were passed to his heir, John the Fearless. After John's assassination in 1419, the two books were given to the young Philip the Good, the third duke of Burgundy. After 1419, many changes were made to the first volume as it was altered for John's widow, Margaret of Bavaria, and later for her son Philip the Good. By 1450, Philip the Good had rebound the large manuscript in two volumes; the first held by Fitzwilliam Museum, has all 150 images of Philip the Bold's commission with seventeen illuminations from the 15th century. It is likely that this volume, which contained the earlier part of the text was separated from the ducal collection as a result of Philip the Good's death. This volume was not acquired until four centuries later by an English collector. The second volume held in Brussels (Bibliothèque royale de Belgique, MS 11035-37) consists only of 15th-century images.

== Devotional Use ==
This prayerbook connects to Paris not only artistically, but devotionally. The text and miniatures refer to the holy relics held within the Sainte-Chapelle which was constructed by St. Louis. In Mémoir de la couronne on f. 226, a man assumed to be Philip and dressed in a pink robe and kneels under gold curtains in front of an altar which displays the Crown of Thorns and head reliquaries of a bishop and king. The devotional connection to the Crown of Thorns, the True Cross, and other relics kept in Sainte-Chapelle is established by the series of Memorie or Suffrages which starts on f. 226 . Devotees would use the manuscript to pray to Mary and the saints as if they were mediators, therefore, the manuscript itself acted as an indirect shrine.

== Description ==
In some manuscripts, the scribes would leave detailed instructions for the artists in the blank areas of a page. Certain subjects became so standard that artists would have understood the instructions with the simplest of hints. Illuminators of the books of hours would have been especially accustomed to these side notes, so it can be speculated that the illuminator of this manuscript would know from small guidewords what an image required. For example, key words like rois would tell the illuminator that a page called for an image of narratives such as the Adoration of the Magi in full detail. These side notes indicated that the illuminators could read. Hours like this would have included elaborate illuminated border decorations and miniatures illustrated to show one's piety, privilege, and status.

=== Materials ===
The text was made up of different colored inks throughout the manuscript. The headings would most likely have been red since it was the most convenient color. Red lead and vermilion were common throughout Europe since Antiquity. Both made good ink that flowed easily from a quill pen. Other colors like blue ink had components that made the pigment too gritty to easily write with. A variety of colored inks would have commonly been used in the Calendars of this manuscript as well. Calendars were often used at the beginning of the books of hours. They were made up of lists of the saints' days for every month of the year. Saints' names were often written in black, and major feasts such as Easter or Christmas were written in red. Colored ink was used to show status with minor feasts written in black, mid-level festivals written in red, and major feasts written in gold or blue.

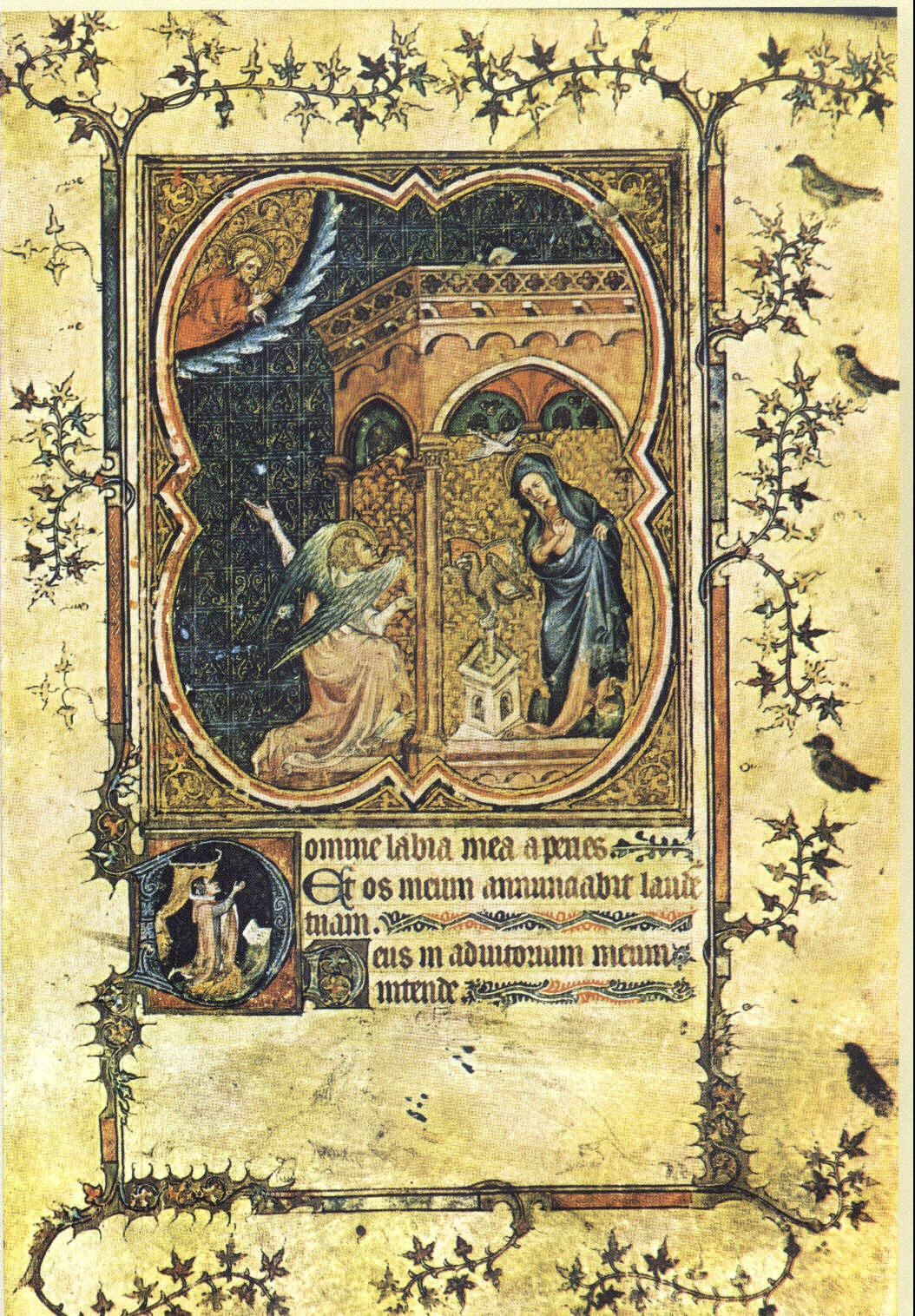
Annunciation, Folio 13r

=== Miniatures ===
Miniatures were added to the manuscript to help readers grasp the religious narrative, rather than a long page of text. This made reading the manuscript more enjoyable, especially for those who were not literate. The text of a book of Hours never included religious narratives such as the Annunciation in Matins or the Nativity of Christ in Prime. In the case of manuscripts like the Hours of Philip the Bold, the images were not mere illustrations of the text, but tools to quickly recognize the various sections of the manuscript. Images were primarily used as a way to become familiar with the opening of each portion of the text. The illustrations generally follow a set order. It is possible that this is done so that the images can aid one in meditation. The miniatures might also represent events of the Virgin Mary's life at specific hours in a day.

The eleven large miniatures each take up three quarters of the text area of a page. They are enclosed with quatrefoil frames within rectangles that are decorated with gold foliated corners. Moldings were painted red, white, and blue, which was common among fourteenth century Parisian manuscripts made for court patrons.

=== Iconography ===
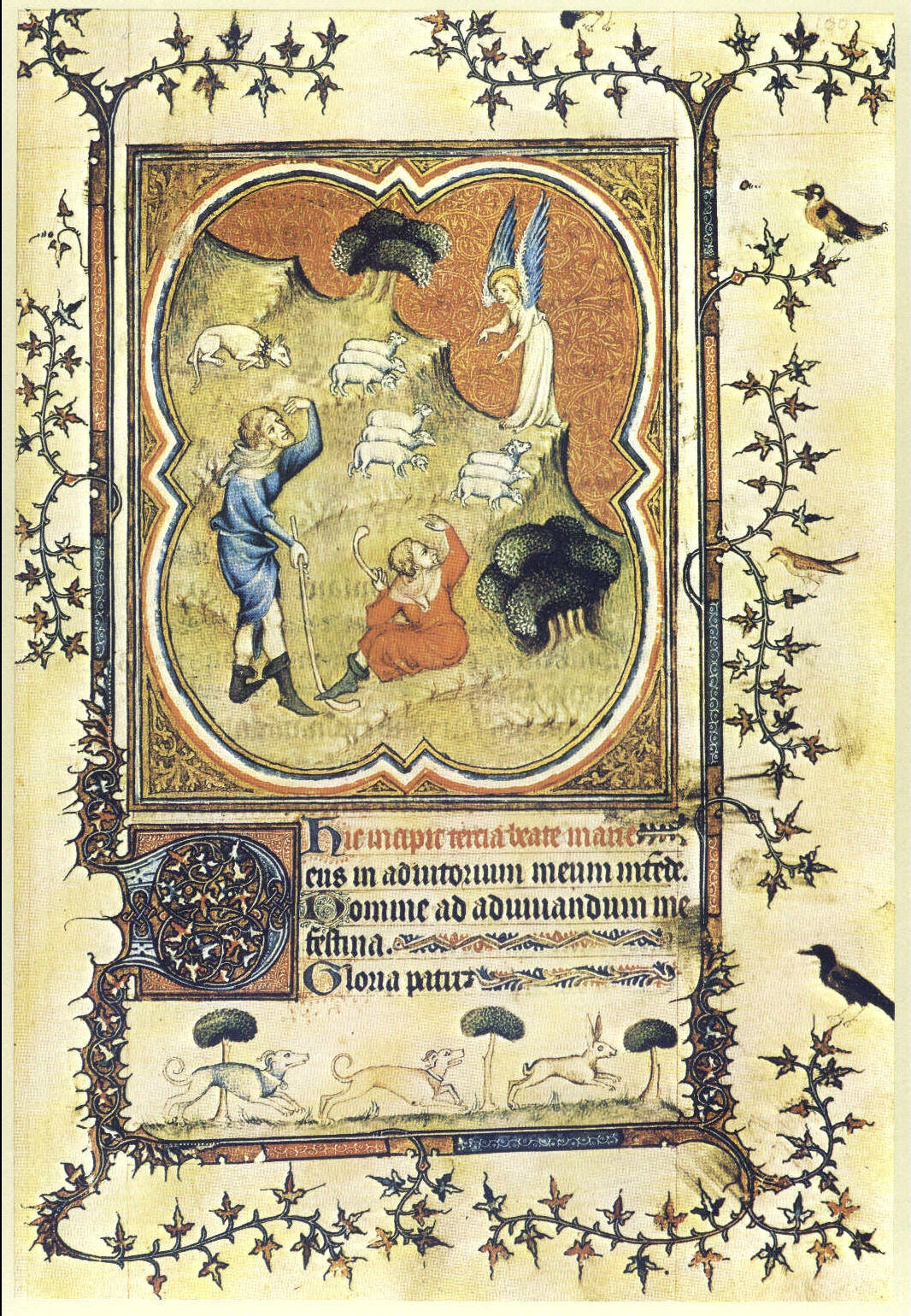
Annunciation to the Shepherds, Folio 100r

Below a miniature of the Annunciation on folio 13v, the initial D depicts a figure situated under a gold curtain in front of a wall decoration covered with fleurs-de-lys. It has been suggested that this figure represents Philip the Bold. He looks up at the Virgin in the miniature who stands in a standard Gothic pose under a portico and in front of a curtain of a similar pattern. As in traditional Annunciation scenes, the Archangel Gabriel appears from the left side of the scene and points with a dramatic motion towards the angels in the sky and God.

In Annunciation to the Shepherds on folio 100r, two shepherds are depicted holding hockey-style clubs, or houlettes, which are tools used for collecting stones and earth for throwing at disobedient sheep when they wander from the herd. A dog wears a spiked collar to protect the shepherds and the sheep from being attacked by wolves or bandits. The dog suspiciously contemplates the Angel hovering above the scene.
