= Book of Hours (Milan, Biblioteca Trivulziana, Cod. 470) =

15th-century manuscript

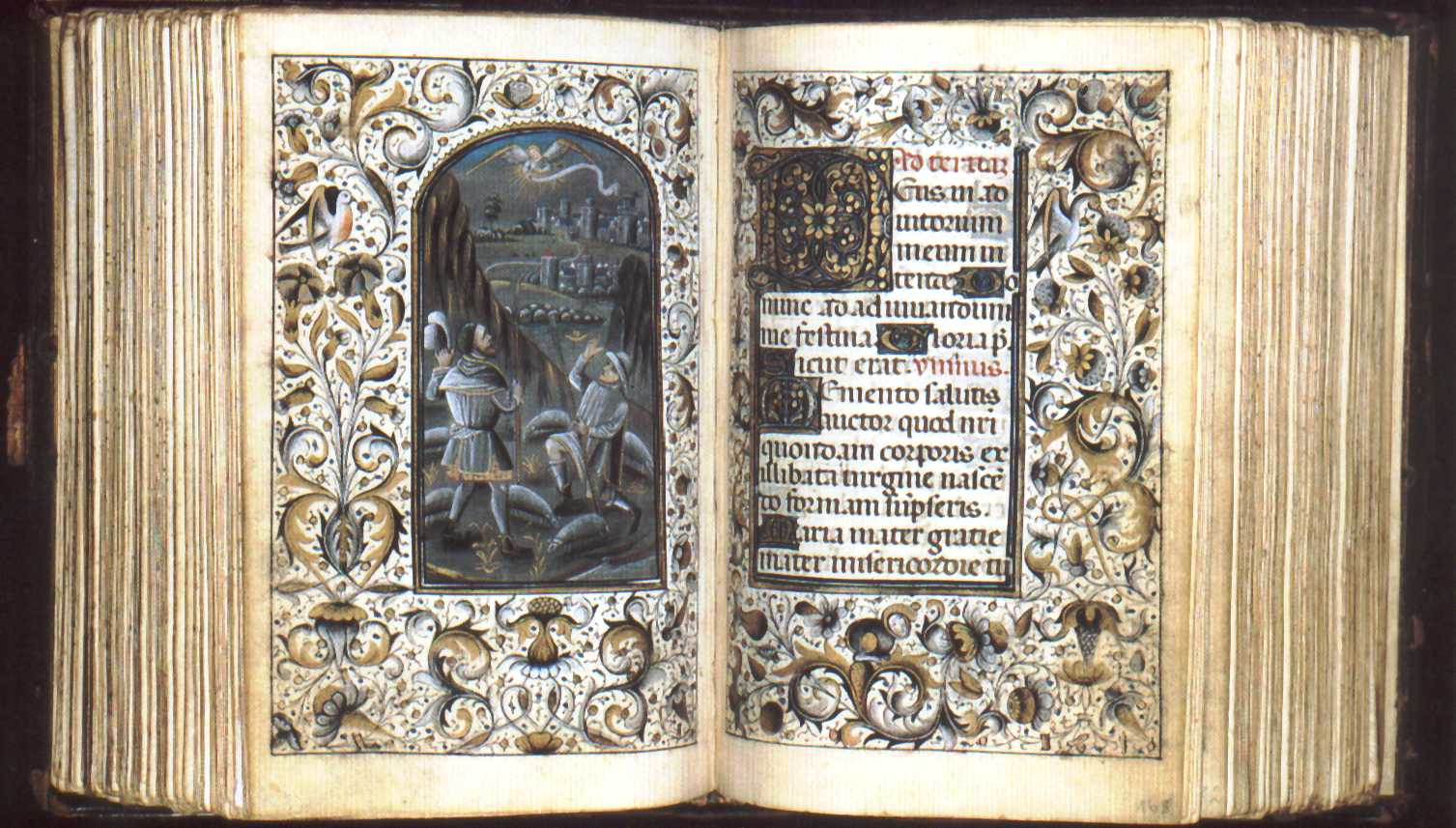
- These two pages from a Book of Hours in the Biblioteca Trivulziana contain a miniature of the Annunciation to the Shepherds and a decorated initial.
- Language: Latin

Full text
- Book of Hours at French Wikisource
- Q3257220 at English Wikisource

Milan, Biblioteca Trivulziana, Cod. 470 is a 15th-century Book of Hours. It was made in a French-Burgundian scriptorium. It measures 131 by 89 mm (5.2 by 3.5 in) and has 366 folios. The text is written in Textualis Gothic bookscript. There are twenty grisaille miniatures within wide, decorated borders. There are also twenty-two pages with elaborate initials and borders which match the borders surrounding the miniatures. There are many other less elaborate decorated initials. The miniatures are the work of an unknown artist from the circle of Philippe de Mazerolles. The codex is still bound in its original binding of brown leather with stamped ornamentation.
