= Hours of Charles V =

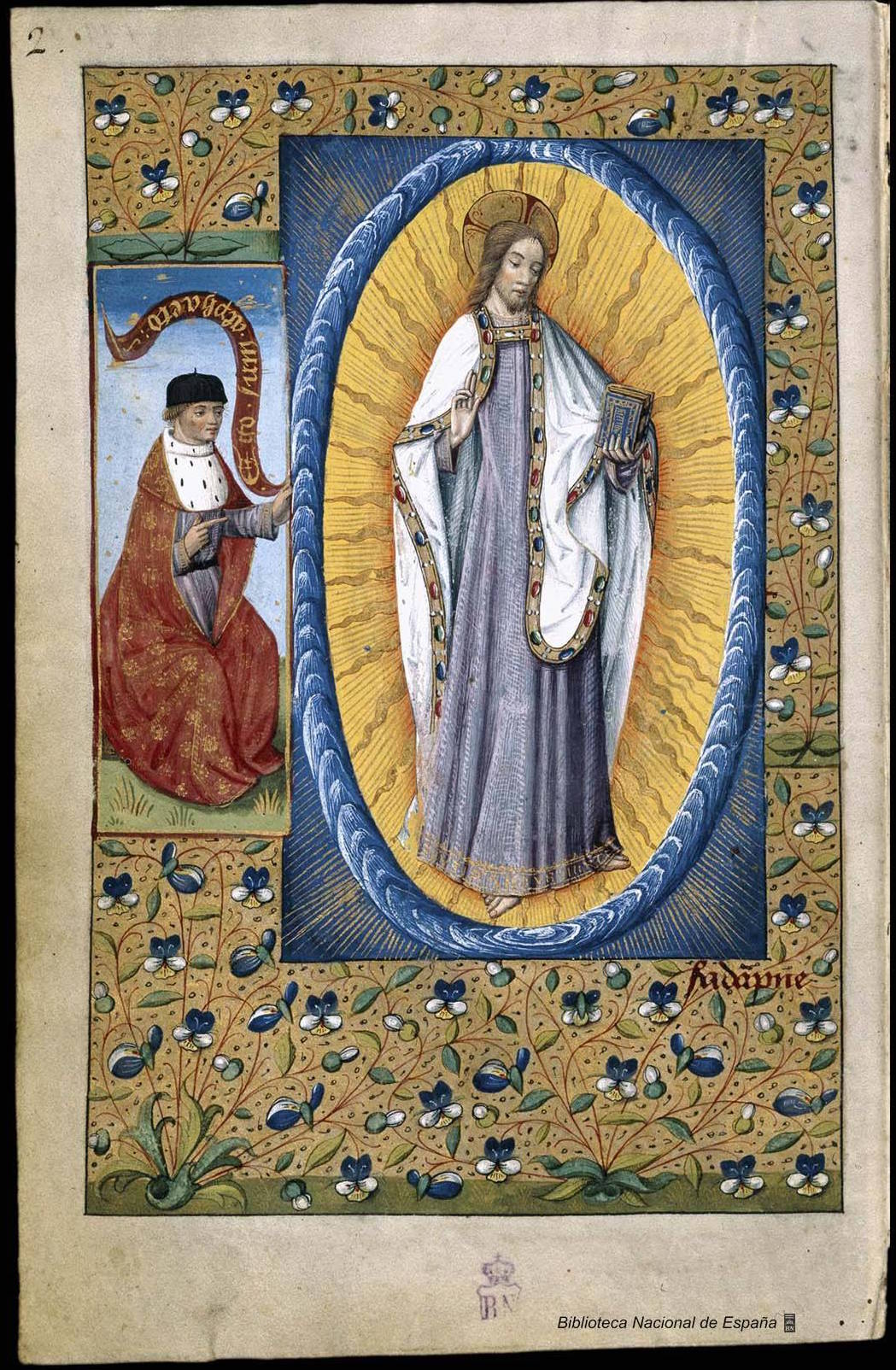
Christ

The Hours of Charles V is an illuminated book of Hours produced in Paris (possibly by the workshop of Jean Poyer) in the late 15th or early 16th century. A 17th century note in the book indicates that it was owned by Charles V, Holy Roman Emperor. The book was not made for Charles but he acquired it from an anonymous donor. It is now in the Biblioteca Nacional de España.
