= Black Hours =

Black Hours may refer to:

- Black books of hours, a fifteenth century style of illuminated manuscript with black pages
  - Black Hours, Morgan MS 493, an illuminated manuscript in the Morgan Library
  - Black Hours, Hispanic Society, New York
  - Black Hours of Galeazzo Maria Sforza
- Black Hours (album), by Hamilton Leithauser
