= Master of the Vienna Chroniques d'Angleterre =

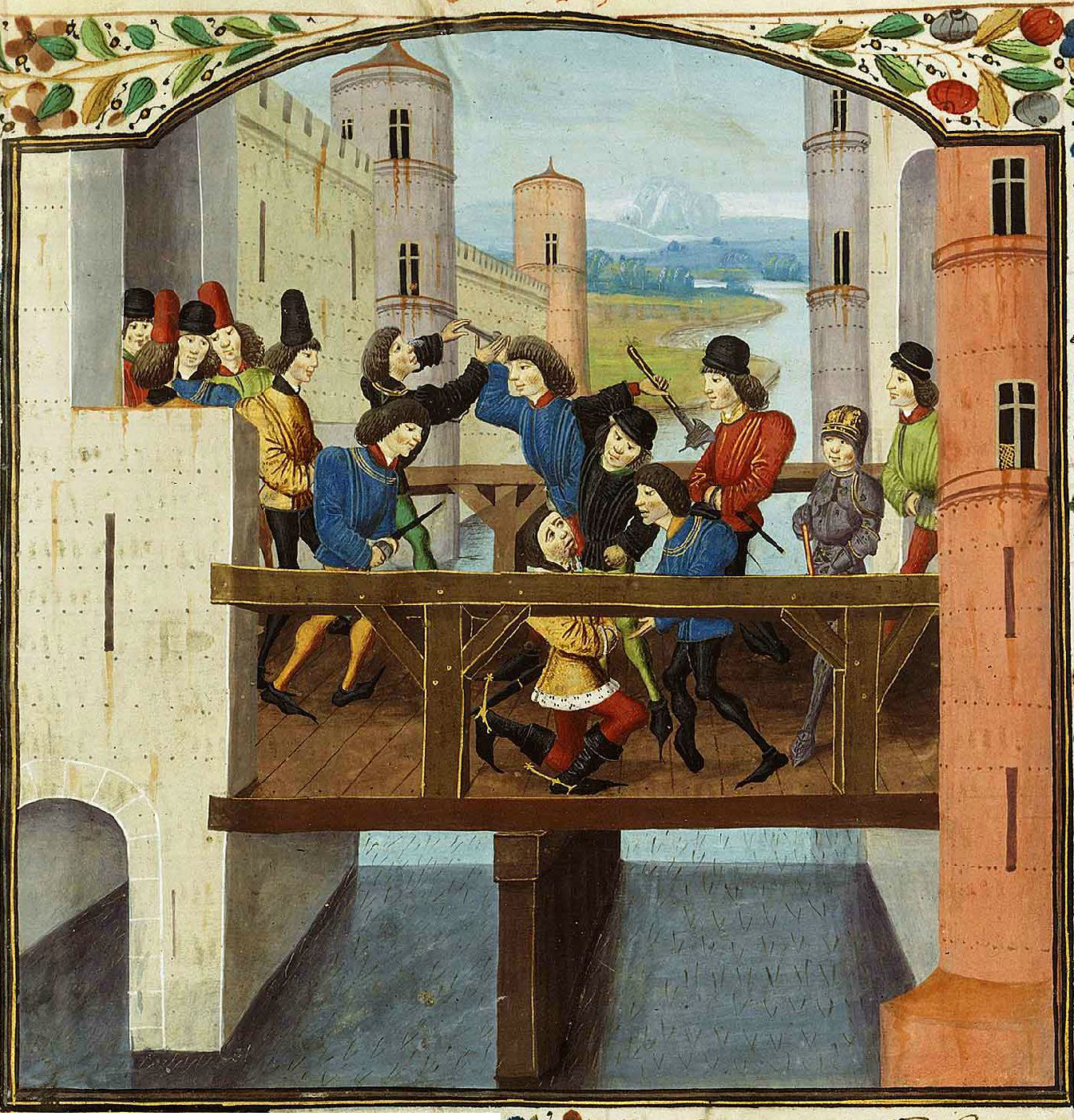
Assassination of John the Fearless, Chronique de Monstrelet, BNF, Fr. 2680

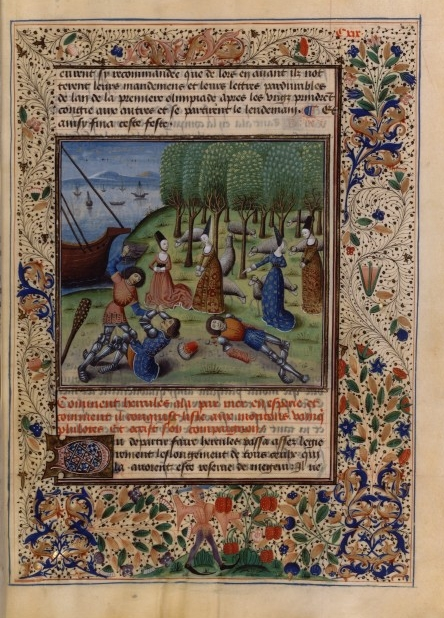
The golden apples of the Garden of the Hesperides, Histoires de Troie, BNF, Fr. 59.

The Master of the Vienna Chroniques d'Angleterre is the name conventionally given to a manuscript illuminator active in Bruges between 1470 and 1480. He owes his name to his work on several manuscripts, including one held by the Austrian National Library in Vienna, of Jean de Wavrin's Recueil des croniques d'Angleterre. He specialised in illuminating manuscripts on historical subjects.

== Biographical gleanings ==
The style of this artist was detected for the first time by the German art historian Friedrich Winkler in a manuscript of the first volume of the Recueil des chroniques d'Angleterre (Austrian National Library MS 2534). His hand was later found in six other manuscripts of the same text which gave it its name of convenience, the Master of the Vienna Chroniques d'Angleterre. He was an illuminator working in Bruges, who specialized in the illumination of historical or pseudo-historical texts, though he also painted a few books of hours. He carried out orders for several bibliophiles of the court of Burgundy (Louis de Gruuthuse, Antoine de Bourgogne, Philippe de Clèves, Wolfert VI of Borselen) or for bourgeois of the city (Jan III de Baenst). He collaborated on several occasions with the illuminator Philippe de Mazerolles, also sometimes called the Master of the Froissart of Philippe de Commynes.

== Style ==
The works attributed to him show an artist whose style is very uneven and far-removed from naturalism. His figures are generally ungainly, perched on high legs, neckless, with enlarged heads and protruding hairstyles. Their faces are round, with wide eyes and heavy lids. They sometimes take on grimacing attitudes when it comes to expressing feelings. The landscapes are also marked by stylized forms, with horizons tracing landforms and threadlike trees, cities with high walls. His night scenes are remarkable for their use of multiple light sources. The frames of the miniatures painted by the artist contain large motifs, made of thick fruits and berries, grotesques, crested birds, with black or golden backgrounds. His style brings him close to artists such as the Master of Margaret of York or the Master of Anthony of Burgundy, with whom he collaborated, while he remains very far from that of Philippe de Mazerolles.
