= Siege of Brest (1386) =

1386 Hundred Years' War siege

- Part of the Hundred Years' War
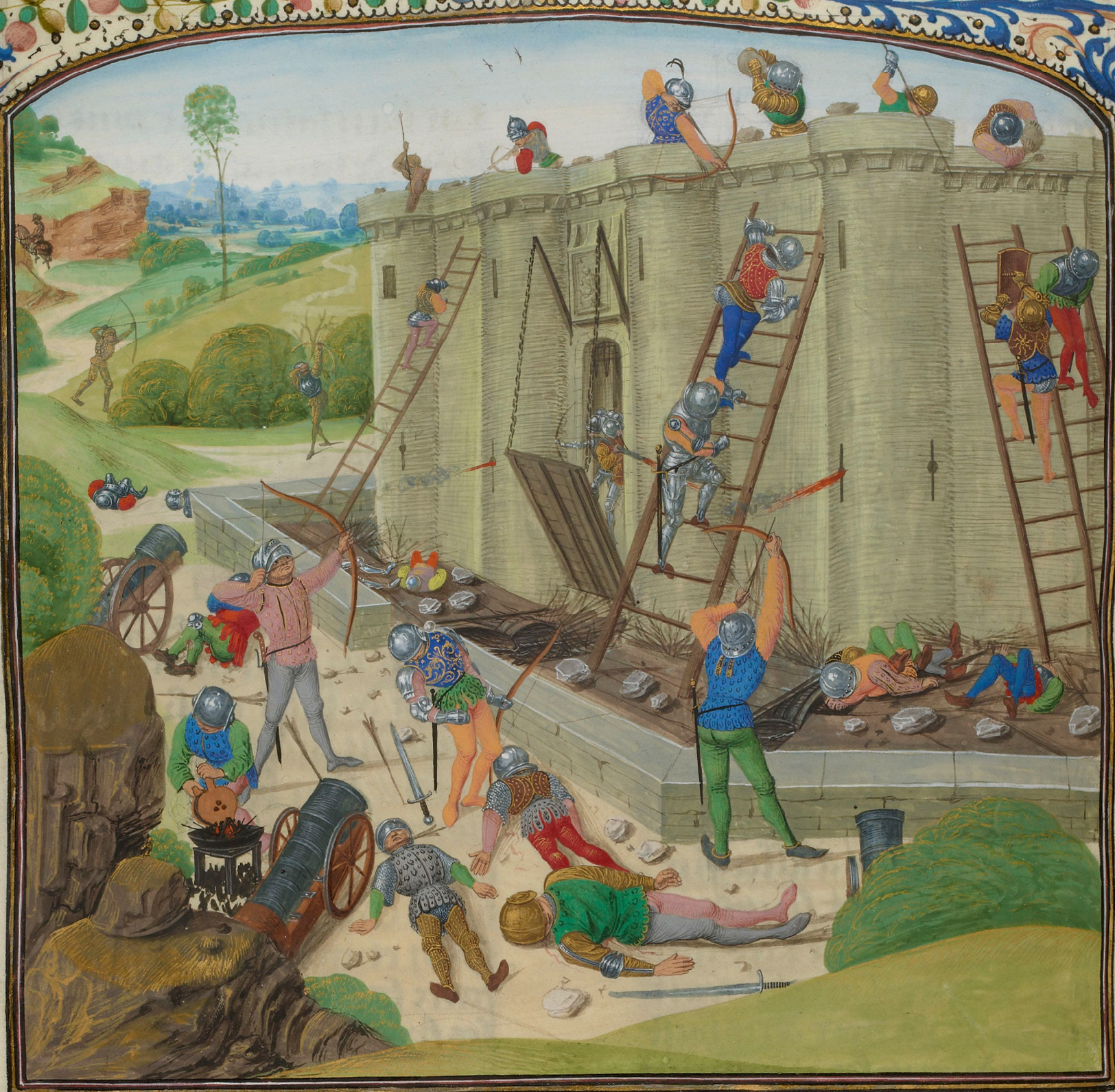
- The siege depicted by the Master of Anthony of Burgundy in MS BnF Fr 2643-6 of Froissart's Chronicles
Date	1386
Location	Brest, Brittany
Result	English relieved Brest

Belligerents
Duchy of Brittany; Kingdom of France	Kingdom of England

Commanders and leaders
John IV, Duke of Brittany; Olivier de Clisson	John Roches; Thomas Asshenden; Relief force: John of Gaunt

The siege of Brest in 1386 was led by John IV, Duke of Brittany, against English-occupied Brest during the Hundred Years' War. The siege was relieved by an English army commanded by John of Gaunt, Duke of Lancaster.
