= Froissart of Louis of Gruuthuse =

Illuminated manuscript of Froissart's Chronicles

Execution of Christian prisoners by Bayezid I after the Battle of Nicopolis in 1396. MS Fr 2646, attributed to the Master of the Dresden Prayer Book

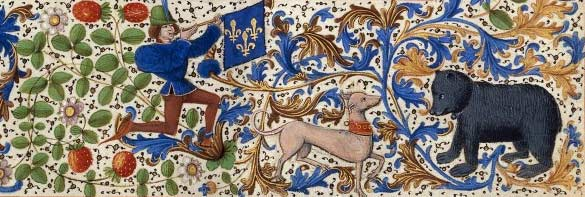
A detail from the margin of a page

The Froissart of Louis of Gruuthuse (BnF Fr 2643–6) is a heavily illustrated deluxe illuminated manuscript in four volumes, containing a French text of Froissart's Chronicles, written and illuminated in the first half of the 1470s in Bruges, Flanders, in modern Belgium. The text of Froissart's Chronicles is preserved in more than 150 manuscript copies. This is one of the most lavishly illuminated examples, commissioned by Louis of Gruuthuse, a Flemish nobleman and bibliophile. Several leading Flemish illuminators worked on the miniatures.

The four volumes are now in the Bibliothèque nationale de France in Paris as BnF, MSS Français 2643–6, and contain 110 miniatures of various sizes painted by some of the best artists of the day. The page size is approximately 44 × 33 cm, with miniatures of various sizes, from three-quarter–page and half-page, to historiated initials. The French text is in two columns and there is extensive marginal decoration of scrolling stems and other plant motifs, with some human and animal figures among them.

== Artists ==
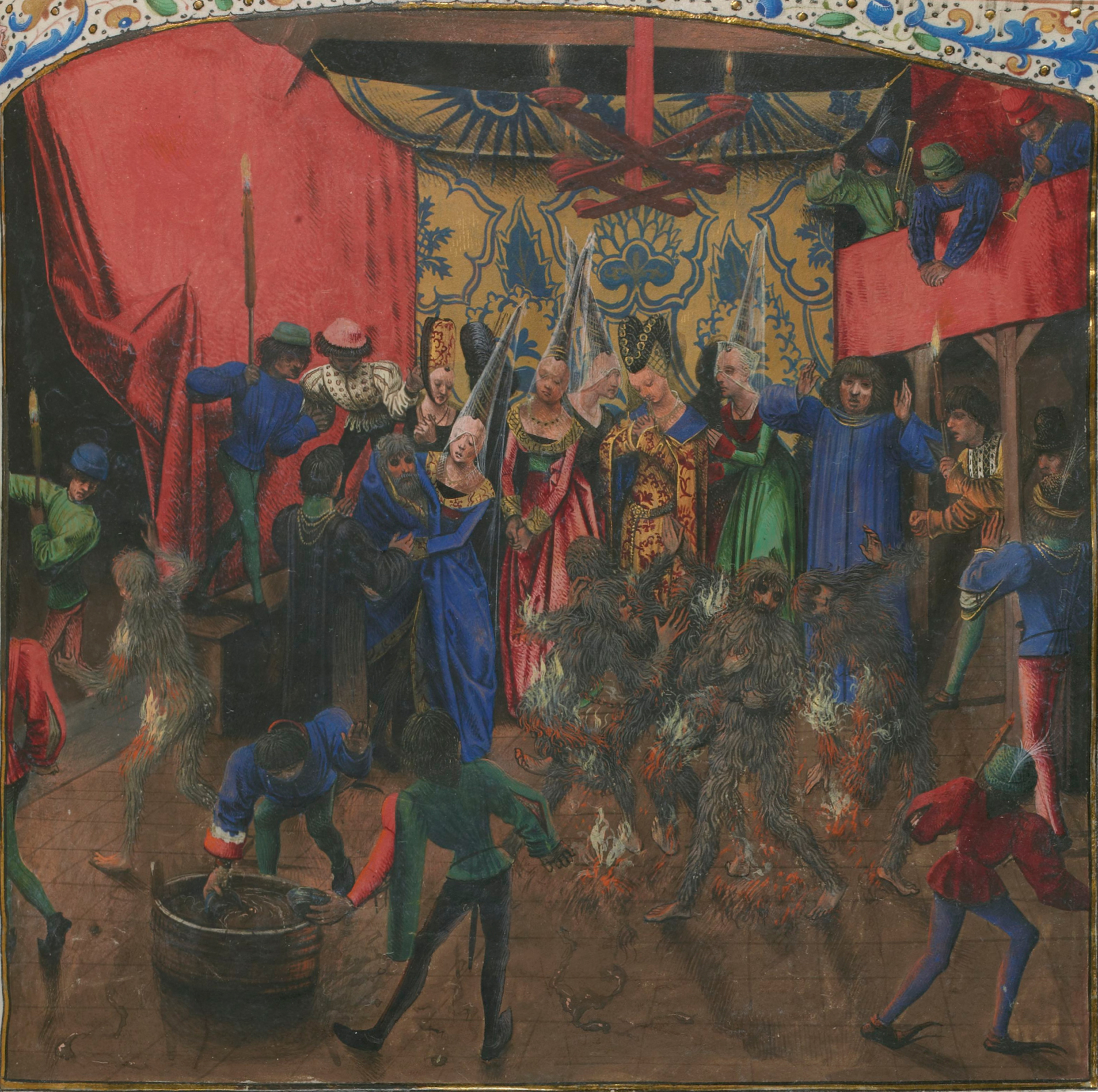
The Bal des Ardents by the Master of Anthony of Burgundy, from BnF Fr 2646, shows his qualities well

Loyset Liédet produced the sixty miniatures in the first two volumes. He was a very successful, if somewhat formulaic, illuminator, working mainly on secular manuscripts for Philip III, Duke of Burgundy (Philip the Good) and his court. He probably used assistants, but it is hard to detect separate hands in his work.

The last two volumes, which are in general finer, were worked on by the anonymous illuminators known as the Master of Anthony of Burgundy (identified by some writers with Philippe de Mazerolles), the Master of Margaret of York, and the Master of the Dresden Prayer Book, the last as an assistant to the Master of Anthony of Burgundy. These masters are named after prominent works or patrons of theirs. It appears that the project was split in half from an early stage, as the scribes who wrote the text and the style of border decoration (also the work of specialists) differ between volumes 1–2 and 3–4.

The large miniatures by the Master of Anthony of Burgundy are especially sophisticated in style, and those by the young Master of the Dresden Prayer Book (above) are notable for "their startlingly ambitious palette and combination of colors, agitated and vibrantly modelled drapery, an apparently inexhaustible range of well-designed figure poses, and challenging placement of figures within complex spaces" (McKendrick). All the illustrations below are from the first two volumes, unless otherwise stated.

== Patron ==
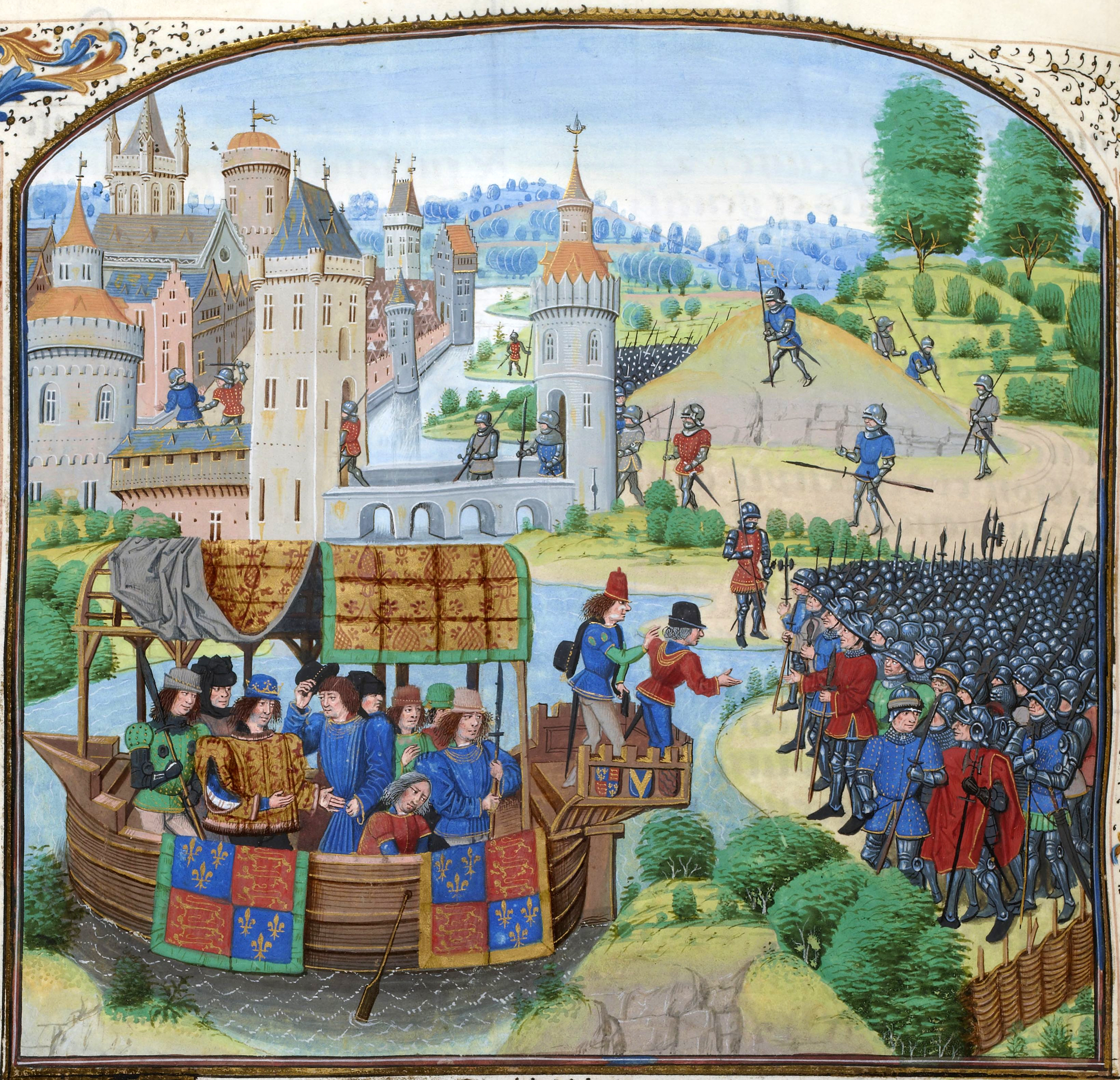
Richard II meets the rebels in 1381, in the lively if pedestrian style of Loiset Lyédet

Louis of Gruuthuse (1427–1492) was born and lived in Bruges and was an important member of the court of Philip the Good. He appears to have been the second largest purchaser in the period, after Philip himself, of illuminated manuscripts from the best Flemish workshops, then at the peak of their success. He had a book collection totalling about 190 volumes, mostly secular in content, of which over half were contemporary illuminated copies. This made his collection over twice the size of the contemporary English royal collection. Louis was in fact one of the last people to commission new manuscripts on such a scale; he probably began collecting books in the late 1460s, with many of his major commissions dating from the 1470s. In some cases even from that decade the titles already existed in printed form, and by the end of his life most titles could be bought printed, and Flemish illumination, especially of secular works, was in deep decline. Froissart's Chronicles were not printed until about 1498, in Paris.

He incorporated portraits of himself in miniatures in several books (but not these volumes); an extra figure, wearing the collar of the Order of the Golden Fleece, appears in his copies but not in similar compositions in other copies of the same works. Many of his volumes, like this set, passed to King Louis XII of France, and are now in the Bibliothèque nationale de France. King Louis painted his arms over those of Louis de Gruuthuse on some pages in this set (and in other books had the Burgundian collar of the Fleece over-painted on the de Gruuthuse figures). The current bindings are later (17th or 18th century), but traces of what were probably the original blue velvet bindings remain.

Like the "Harley Froissart" (British Library Harley MSS 4379–4380), which is the most fully illustrated of all illuminated Froissarts, this is an example of a notable resurgence of interest in Froissart's work from the late 1460s onwards; the earliest parts of the Chronicles were by then over a century old, and covered a period beginning 140 years before.

== Gallery ==
All miniatures are by Loyset Liédet, unless stated. Dates are of the events, not the miniatures.

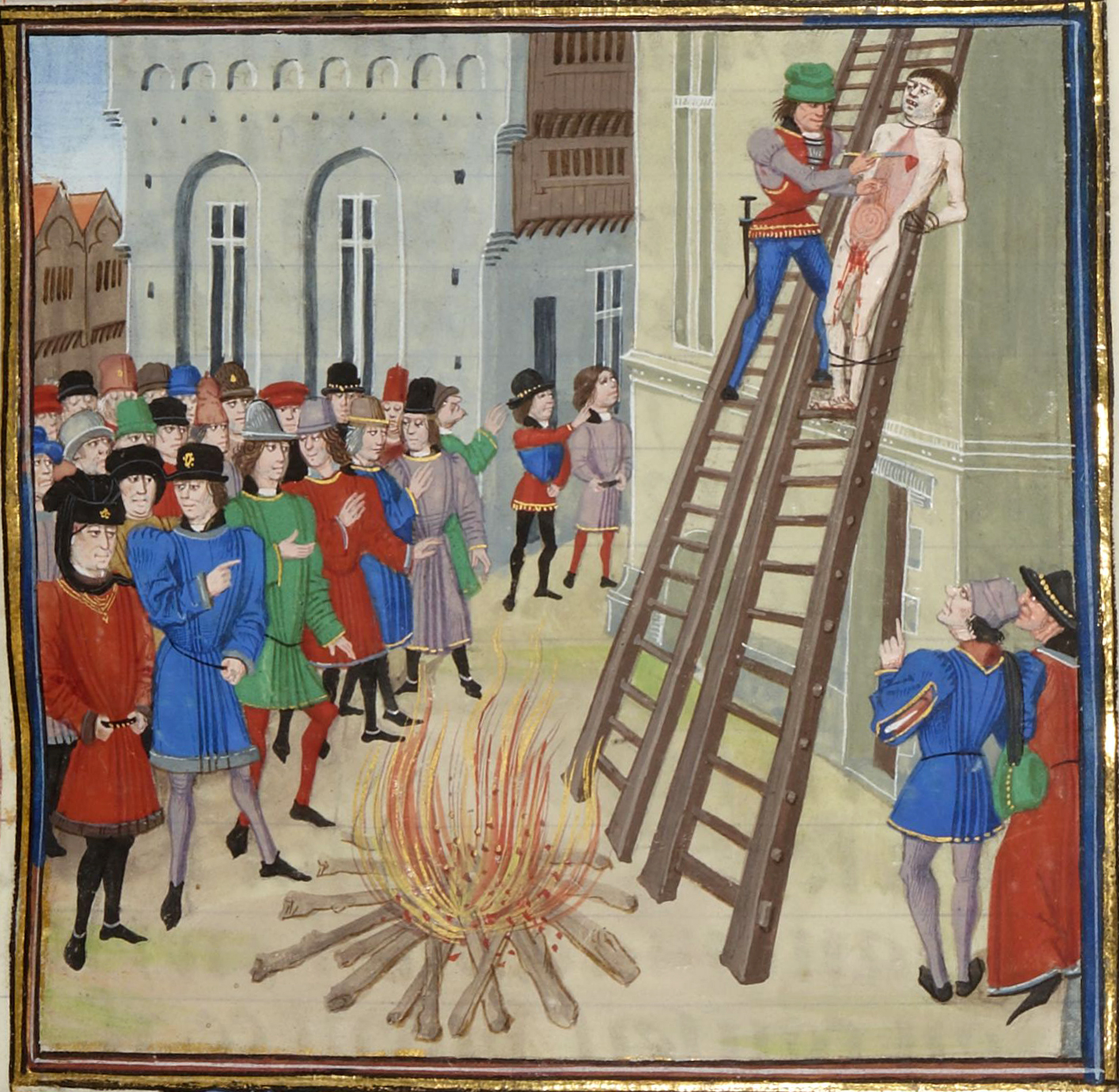
Execution of Hugh the younger Despenser in Hereford, 1326

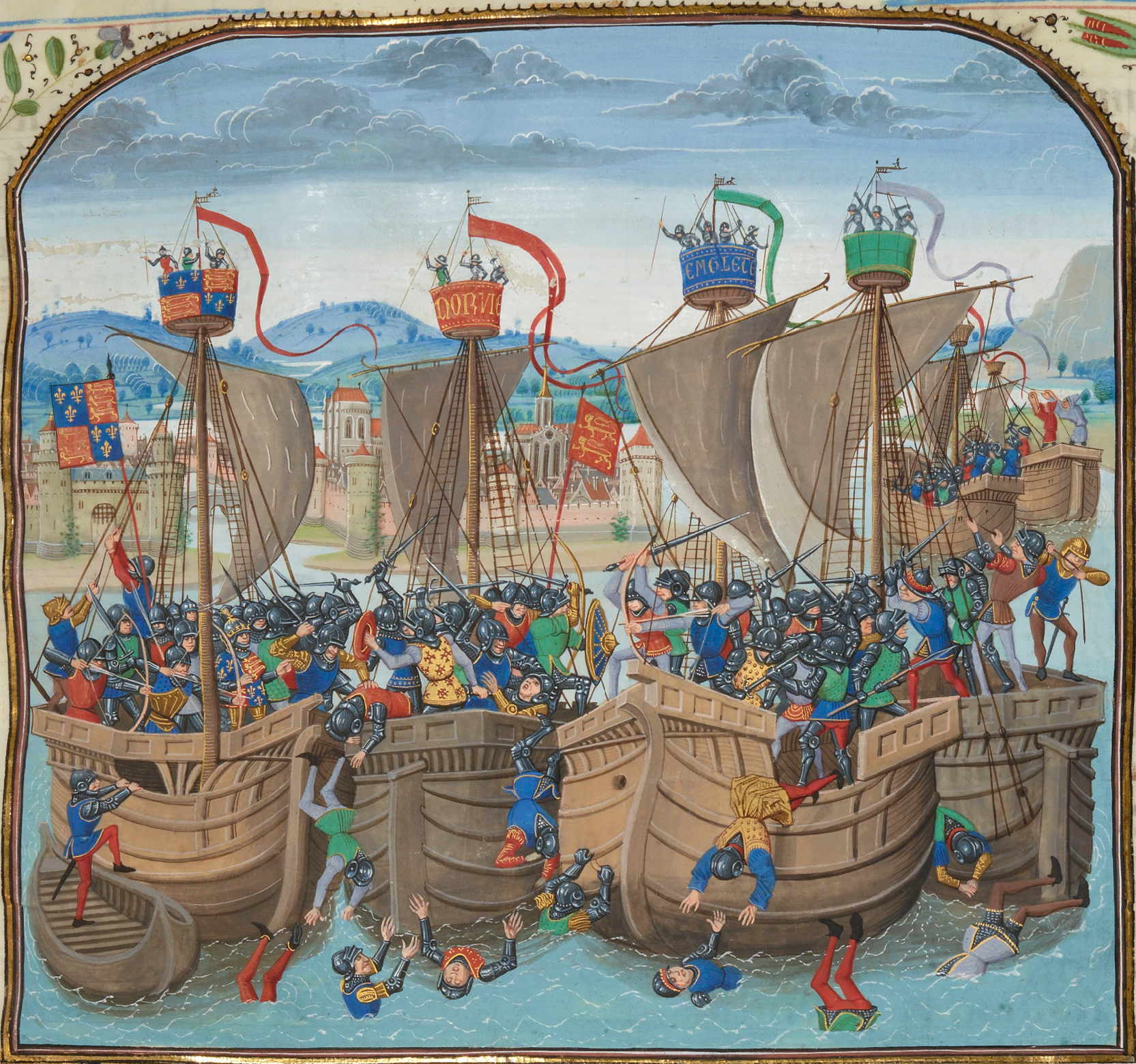
Battle of Sluys, 1340

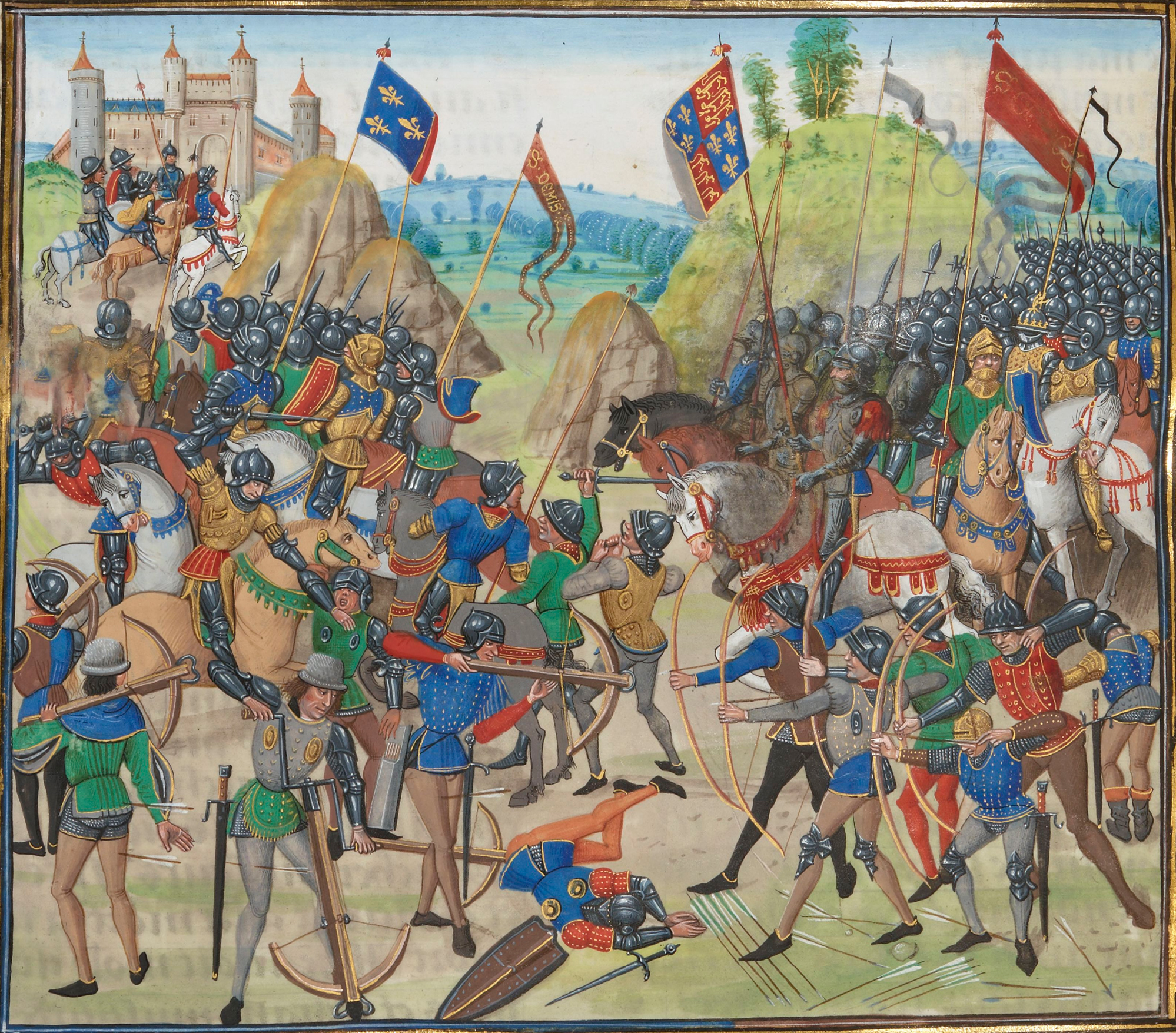
Battle of Crécy, 1346

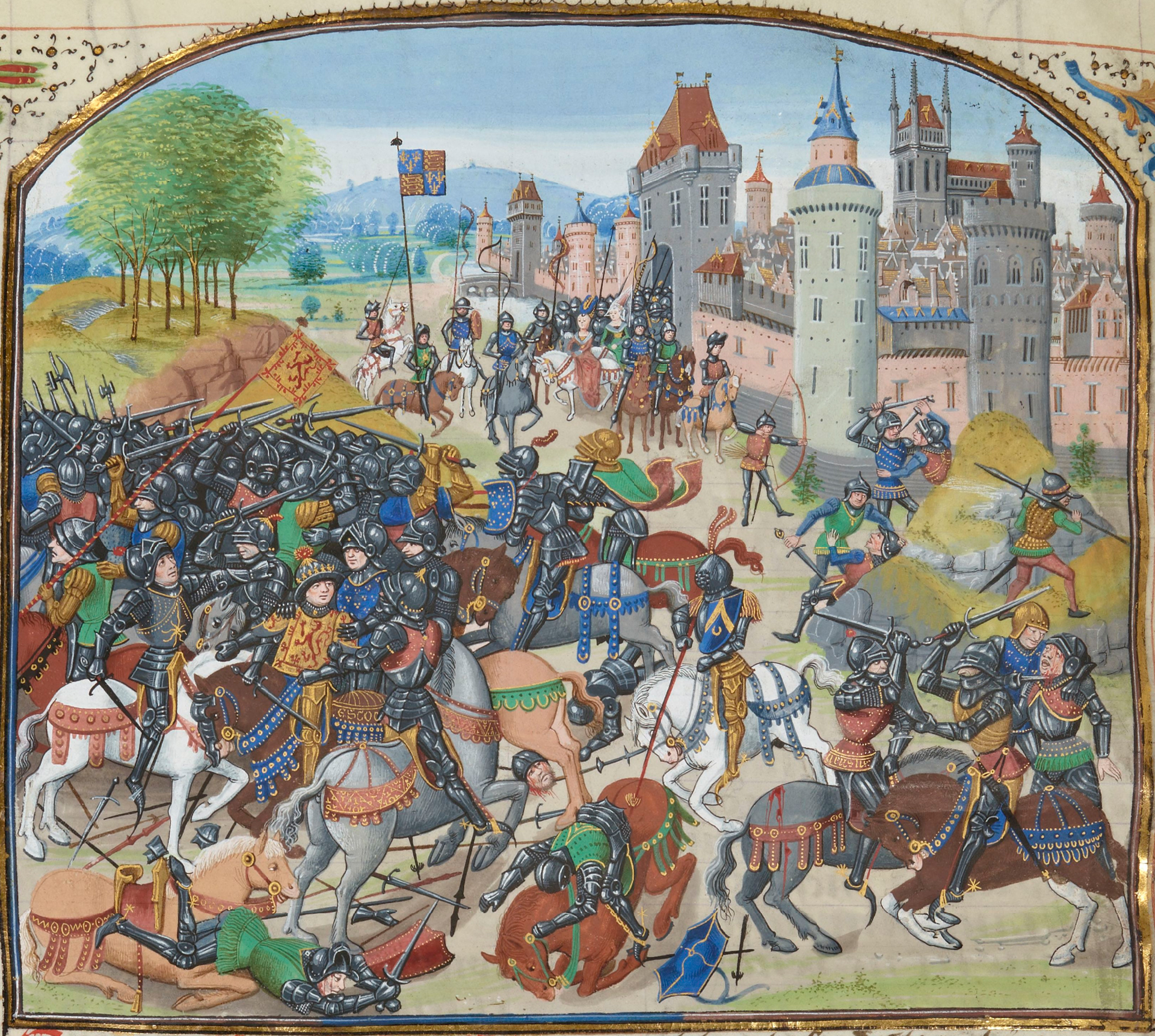
Battle of Neville's Cross, 1346. English victory over the Scots outside Durham.

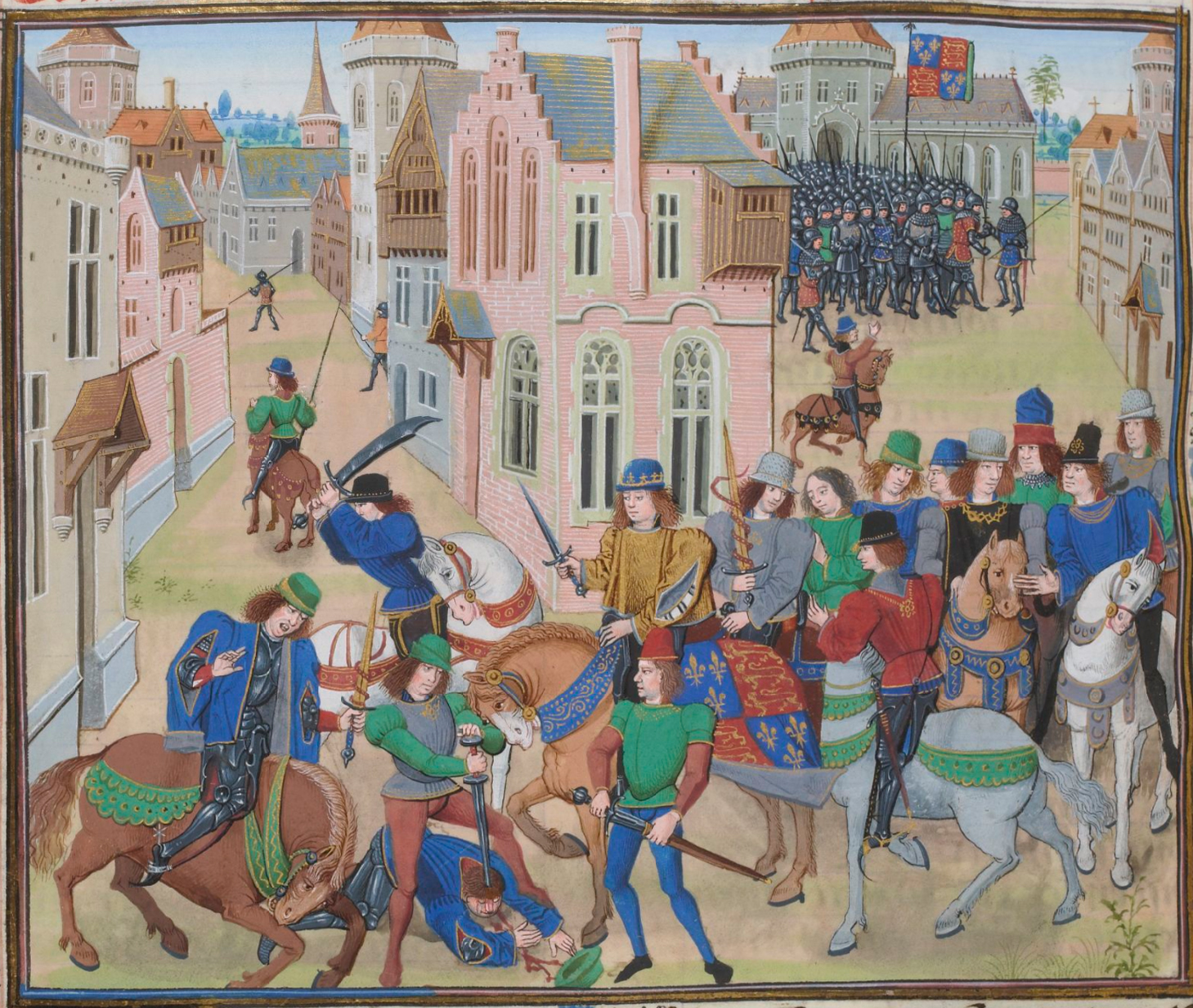
Death of Wat Tyler, leader of the Peasants' Revolt, in London, 1381

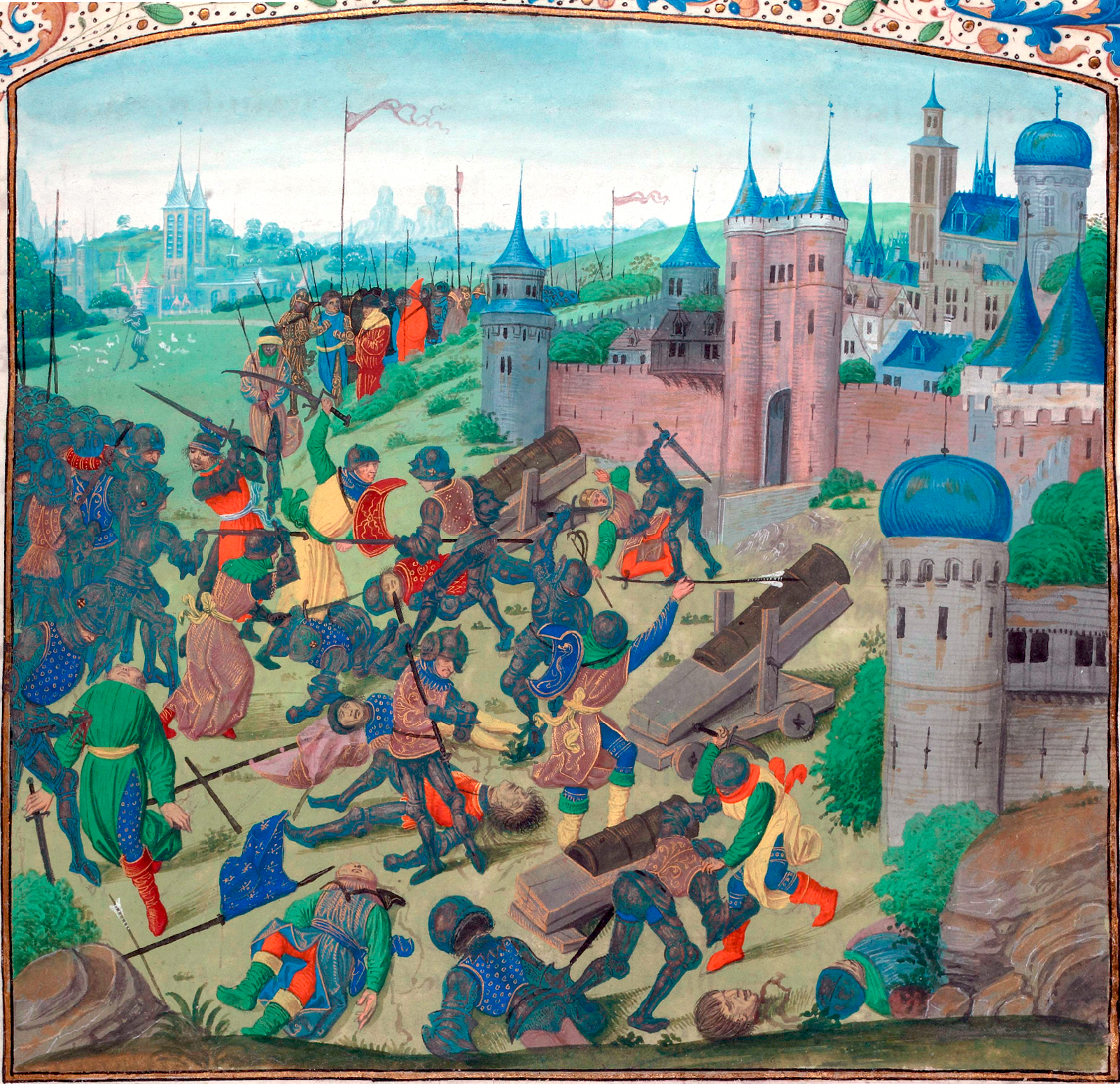
Battle of Nicopolis, 1396, by the Master of the Dresden Prayer Book
