= Flemish Apocalypse =

Early 15th-century illuminated Revelation manuscript

- Bibliothèque nationale de France, Néerlandais 3
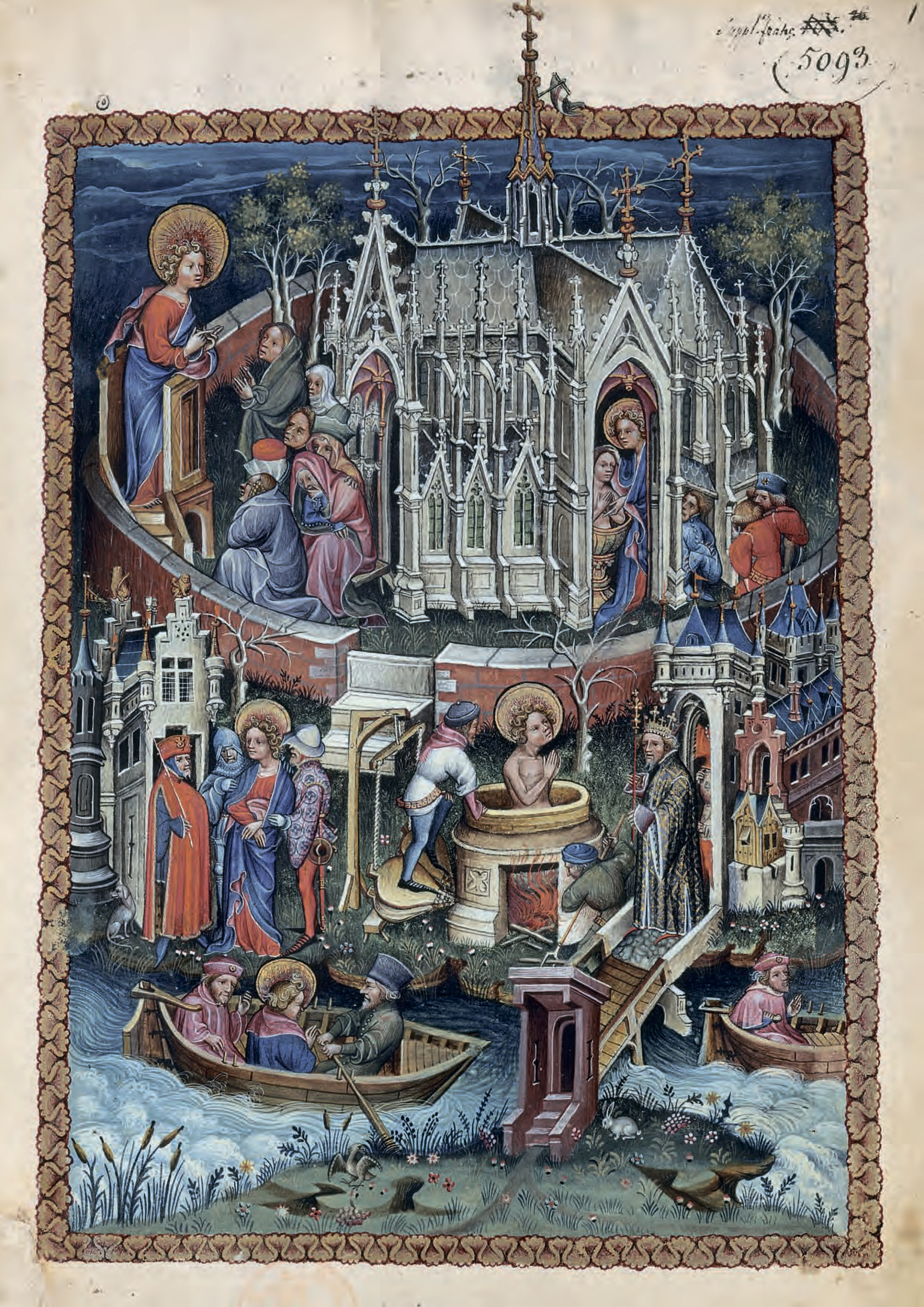
- Life of John, f. 1r
- Date: c. 1400-1410
- Place of origin: Southern Netherlands (Flanders or Brabant)
- Contents: Book of Revelation

Flemish Apocalypse is a luxury illuminated manuscript of the Book of Revelation, dating from the first decade of the 15th century, and produced in the Southern Netherlands, probably in Flanders or Brabant. The Middle Dutch text of the Revelation of John is divided into 22 chapters, each illustrated with a single full-page miniature that combines the events of the chapter in a highly elaborate composition, executed with remarkable skill. The manuscript was clearly produced for a wealthy patron, likely from an urban milieu, and reflects the artistic flowering of the region at the turn of the fifteenth century. Its style is consistent with the International Gothic tradition, while revealing a strong interest in the realistic representation of the world, often described as pre-Eyckian realism.

It is now in the collections of the Bibliothèque nationale de France (Néerlandais 3).

== Contents and structure ==
The manuscript is composed of 23 parchment folios. The text is written on the verso of each folio, with full-page miniatures on the facing recto. The exception is the first folio (f. 1r), which has no facing text and depicts scenes from the life of John prior to his exile to Patmos.

Linguistic analysis by Nelly de Hommel reveals that the text was written in the Southern Netherlands, although it cannot be assigned to a specific Flemish dialect. A similar Flemish translation of the Revelation can be found in six other extant manuscripts, but the Flemish Apocalypse from the Bibliothèque nationale de France is the only one to be fully illuminated. A number of folios contain glosses and additional devotional texts, including the opening of the Gospel of John, the Lord's Prayer and others. The manuscript has one full-page illustration for each chapter of the Revelation text – a rare and intricate narrative strategy that results in complex compositions depicting multiple episodes within a single image, framed by bands of gold clouds.

The manuscript was originally planned as three regular quires of four bifolia each, but its structure was altered after an apparent illuminator error. Several folios were reordered, resulting in a non-sequential chapter arrangement after chapter 16 (from folio 17 onwards): chapter 20, 17, 18, 19, and 22.

== Iconography and style ==
This visual condensation of the Revelation text into a single composition is without doubt manuscript's most distinctive feature. Nevertheless, many of the individual iconographic motifs can be traced to the thirteenth-century Anglo-Norman Apocalypse tradition. The same applies to the inclusion of scenes from the legendary life of John (f. 1r) and the incorporation of the Antichrist scenes into Chapter 11 (f. 12r), both characteristic of this group of manuscripts. The sophisticated iconographic programme that integrates these motifs into a refined visual narrative is unlikely to have been devised specifically for this codex. Rather, it may have been copied from an earlier manuscript model, now lost, with the Flemish Apocalypse representing the only surviving witness to this particular iconographic tradition.

The style of the illustrations displays key characteristics of pre-Eyckian realism, including lively figure types, convincing architectural settings, and a strong sense of movement. Colour is used boldly and vividly, with blues, reds, greens, mauves, yellows, as well as characteristic blue-on-blue or red-on-red backgrounds used to depict heavenly scenes populated by angels or elders.

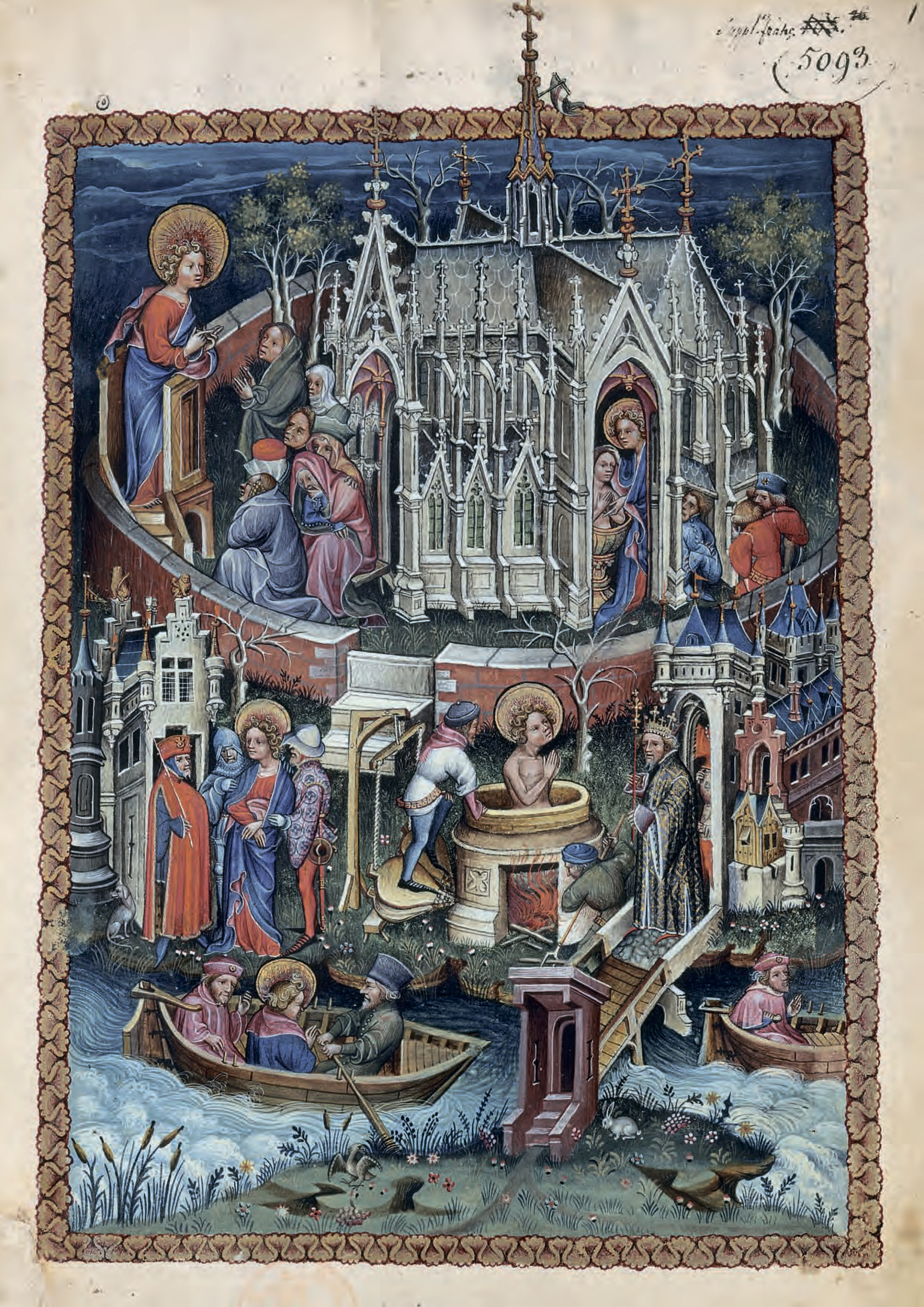
Life of John, f. 1r

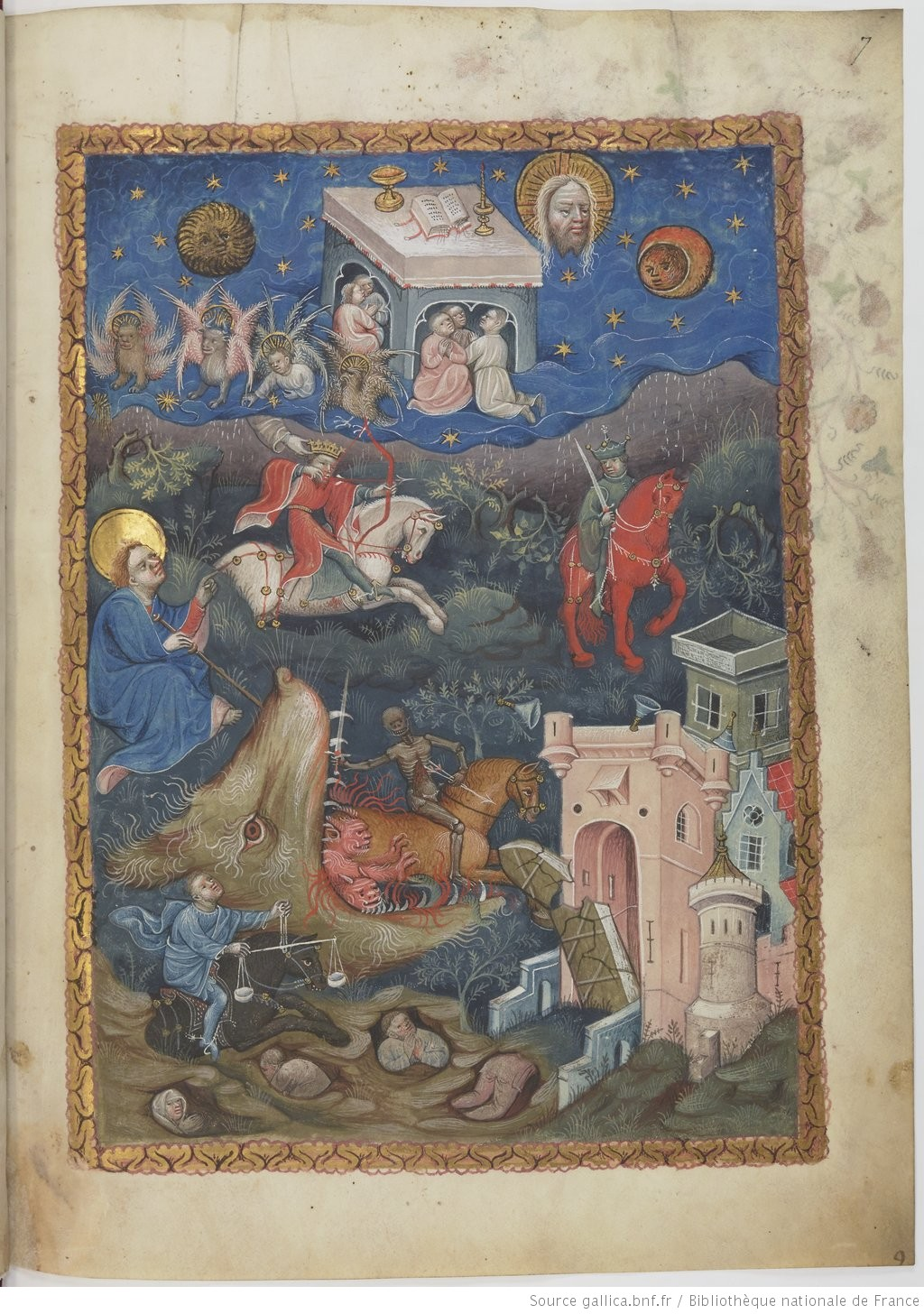
The Four Horsemen, f. 7r

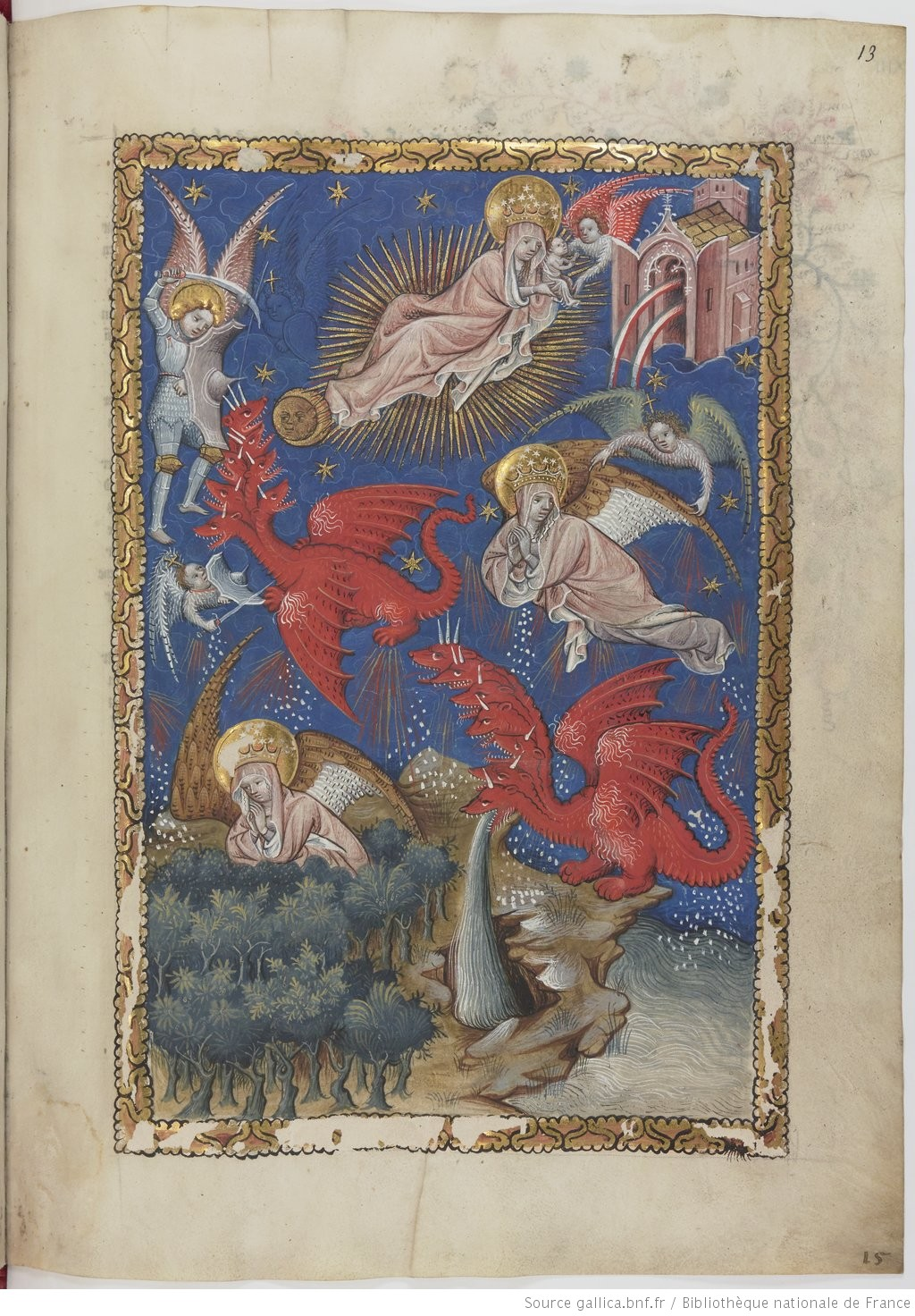
The Woman and the seven-headed Dragon, f. 13r

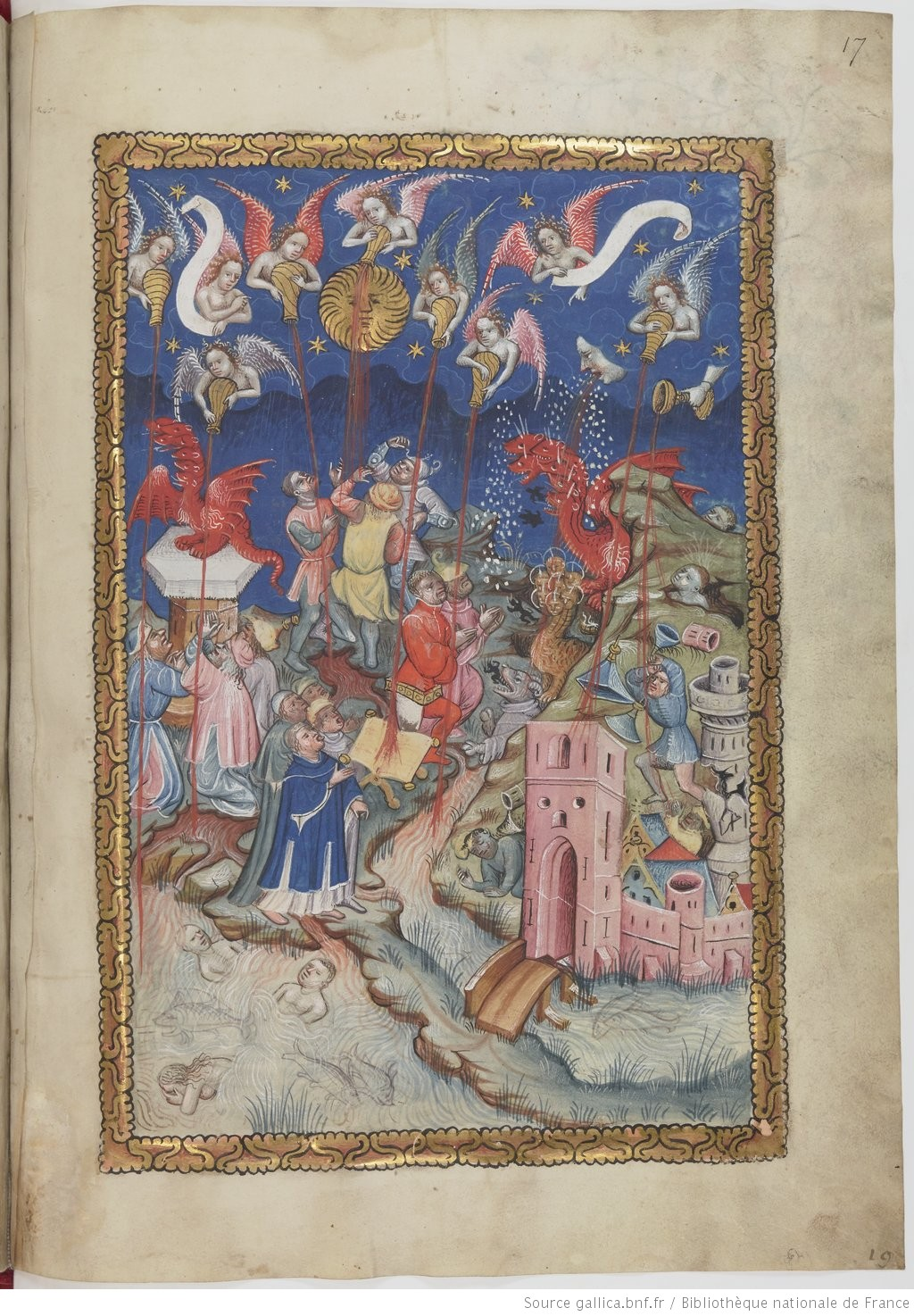
The Seven Vials of Wrath, f. 17r

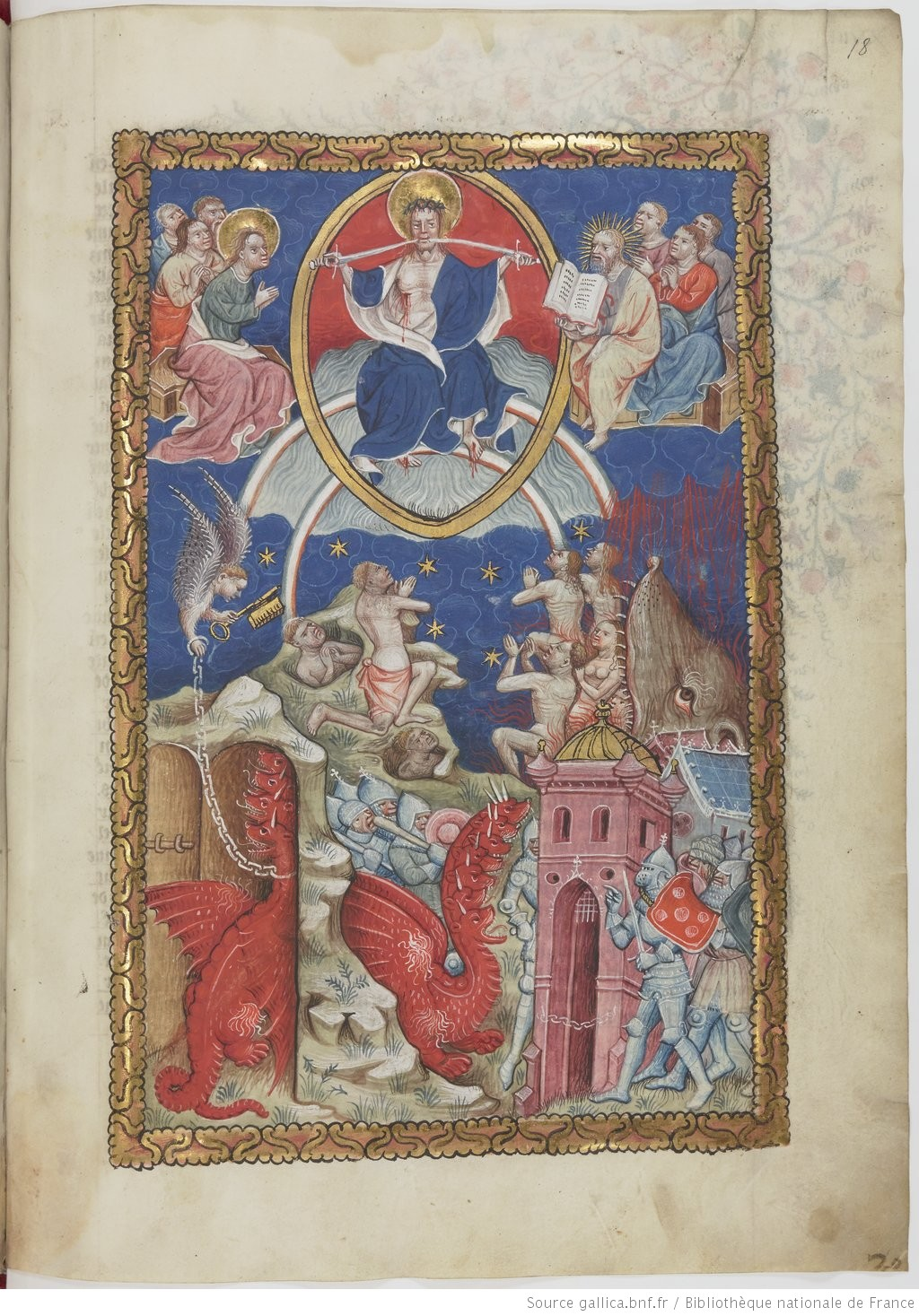
The Last Judgement, f. 18r

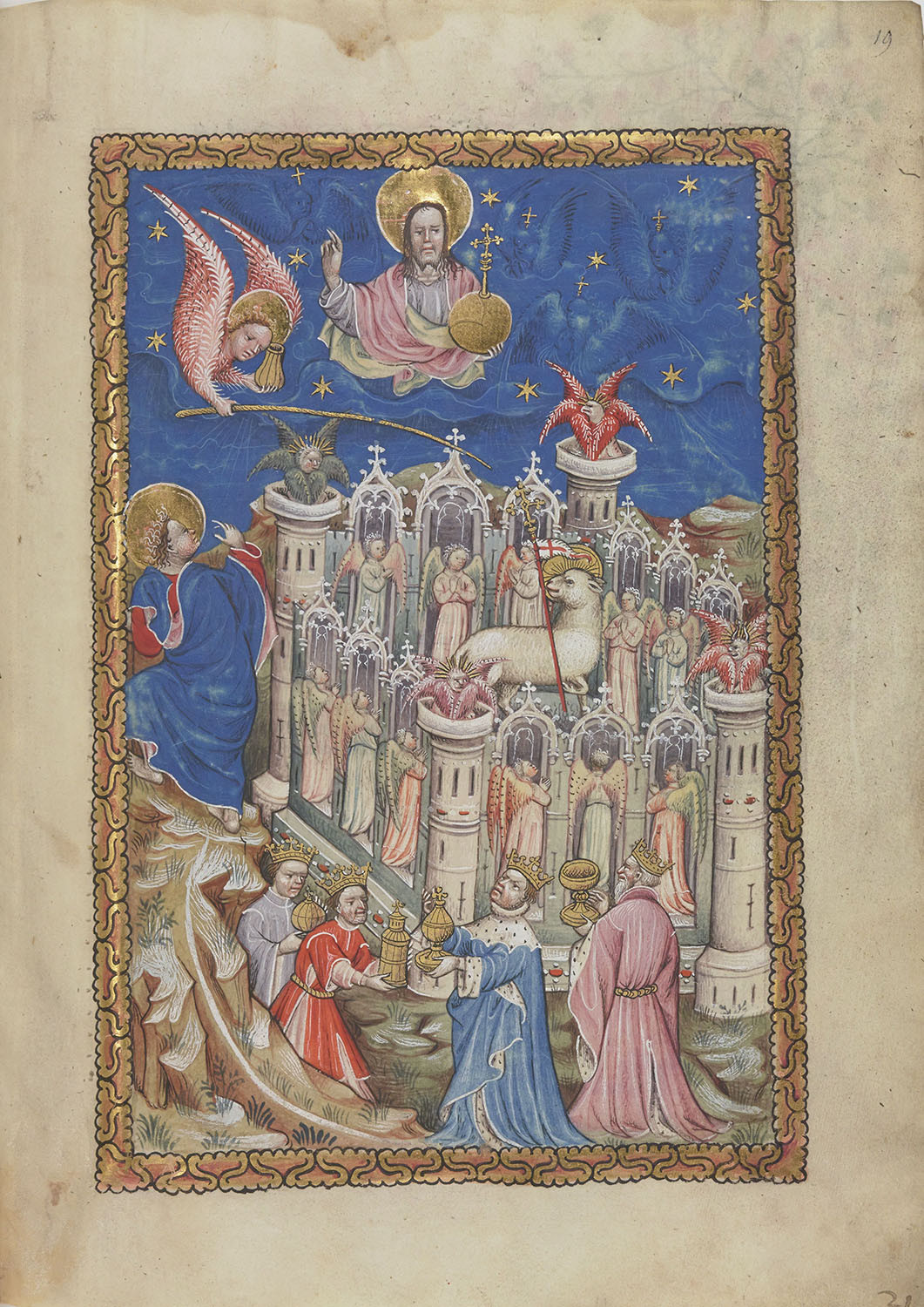
The New Jerusalem, f. 19r

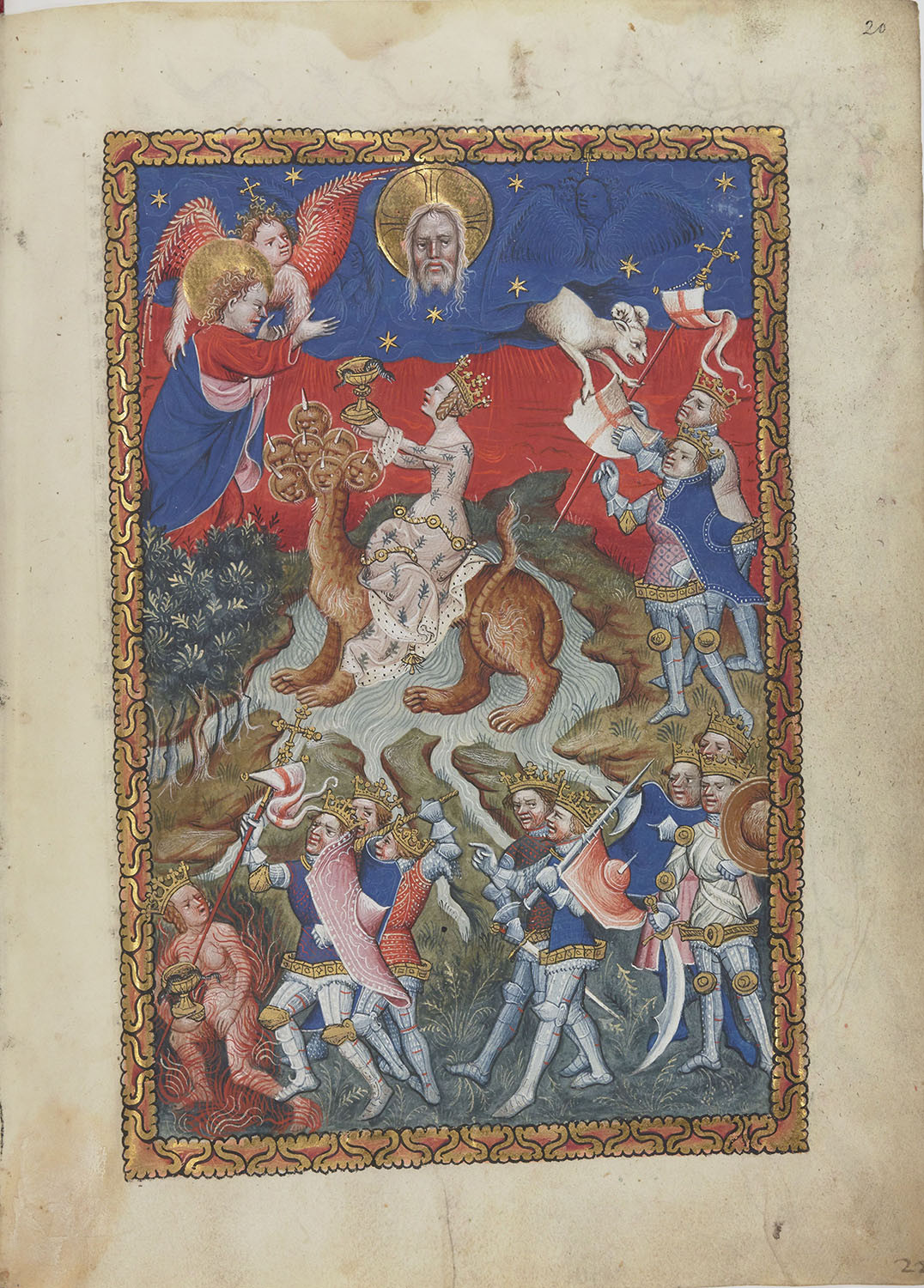
The Great Harlot of Babylon, f. 20r

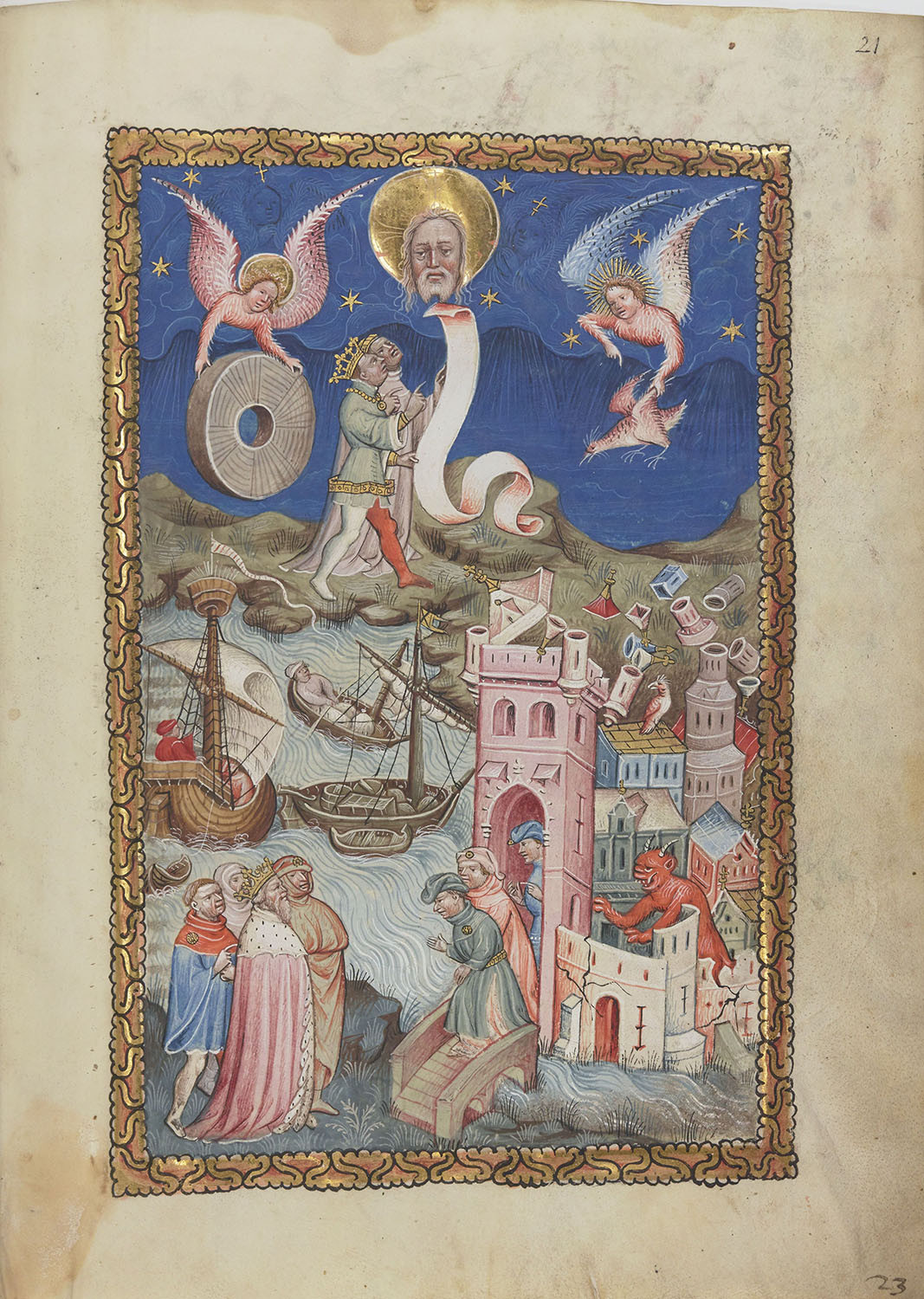
The Fall of Babylon, f. 21r

Each chapter of Revelation text opens with a decorated pen-flourished initial, executed in several stages and probably the work of three different hands. Stylistic analysis indicates that the manuscript miniatures were painted by two artists, with the second illuminator taking over from folio 7r onwards. Neither artist has been securely identified, and neither is known from other surviving works.

== See also ==
- Book of Revelation
- Early Netherlandish painting
- International Gothic
- Black books of hours

== Bibliography ==
- Emmerson, Richard K. (2018). Apocalypse illuminated. The visual Exegesis of revelation in medieval illustrated manuscripts. Pennsylvania: Penn State University Press. ISBN 978-0-271-07865-6.
- Koldeweij, Jos; de Hommel, Nelly (2005). Flemish Apocalypse. Barcelona: M. Moleiro Editor. ISBN 84-88526-98-9.
- de Hommel-Steenbakkers, Nelly (2001). Een openbaring: Parijs, Bibliothèque nationale, Ms. néerlandais 3 (in Dutch). Nijmegen: Nijmegen University Press.
- Smeyers, Maurits (1998). Vlaamse miniaturen: Van de 8ste tot het midden van de 16de eeuw : De middeleeuwse wereld op perkament (in Dutch). Leuven. ISBN 9789061525981.
