= Black Hours, Morgan MS 493 =

Illuminated book of hours

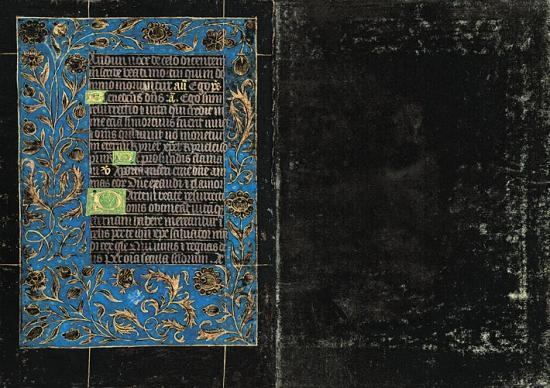
Office of the Dead, folios 121v–122r; the manuscript's closing leaves

The Black Hours, MS M.493 (or the Morgan Black Hours) is an illuminated book of hours completed in Bruges between 1460 and 1475. It consists of 121 pages (leaves) with Latin text written in Gothic minuscule script. The words are arranged in rows of fourteen lines and follow the Roman version of the texts. The lettering is inscribed in silver and gold and placed within borders ornamented with flowers, foliage and grotesques, on pages dyed a deep blueish black; hence its designation as a black book of hours. The book contains fourteen full-page miniatures and opens with the months of the liturgical calendar (folios 3 verso – 14 recto), followed by the Hours of the Virgin, and ends with the Office of the Dead (folio 121v).

MS M.493 has been in the collection of the Morgan Library & Museum, New York, since 1912. It is one of seven surviving black books of hours, all originating from Bruges and dated to the mid-to-late 15th century. They are so named for their unusual dark blueish appearance, a colourisation achieved through the expensive process of dyeing the vellum with iron gall ink. This dye is very corrosive and the surviving examples are mostly badly decomposed; MS M.493 is in relatively good condition due to its very thick parchment.

The book is a masterpiece of Late Gothic manuscript illumination. However, no records survive of its commission, but its uniquely dark tone, expense of production, quality and rarity suggest ownership by privileged and sophisticated members of the Burgundian court. The book is often attributed, on stylistic grounds, to a follower of Willem Vrelant, a leading and influential Flemish illuminator.

== Commission ==
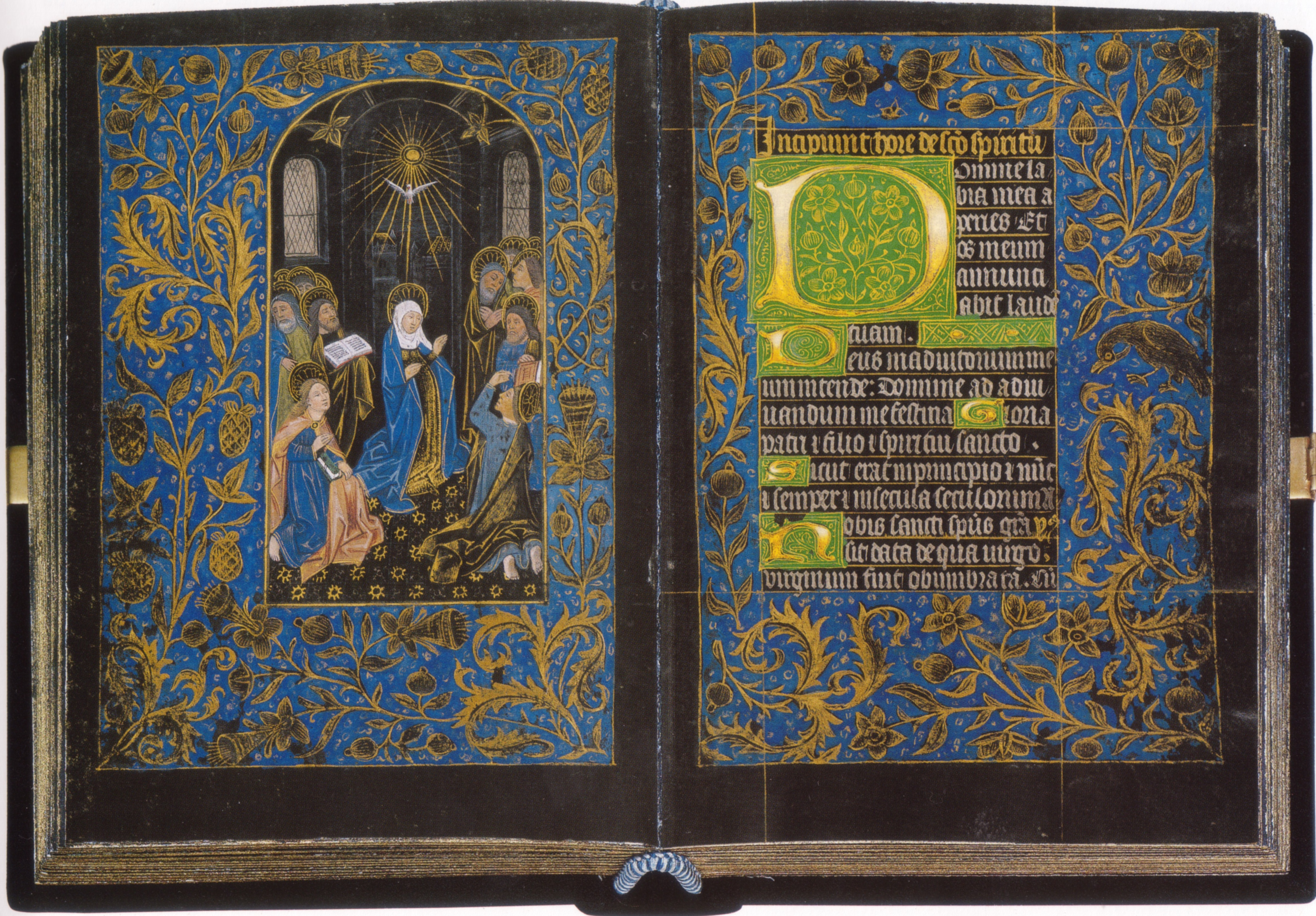
Pentecost, folios 18v–19r, c. 1460–75. Morgan Library & Museum, New York. Each folio measures 170 × 122 mm.

The black books of hours are a grouping of four to five (some books so defined contain only a few pages in this style) extant Flemish illuminated manuscripts so named for their dark appearance. The effect was achieved by soaking the vellum in black dye or ink before they were lettered with gold and silver leaf. The black dye was highly corrosive so the metals had to be of high purity, and the vellum needed to be unusually thick to survive the process. The black manuscripts date from about 1455–80 and include the "Black Hours, Hispanic Society, New York" (c. 1458), "Black Hours of Galeazzo Maria Sforza" (c. 1466–67) and the "Hours of Mary of Burgundy" (c. 1477). The artwork is of a sophisticated and unusual taste, and the uncommon colour of the pages likely carried an almost mystical aura for the owner. MS M.493 can thus be assumed as intended for high nobility; probably from the court of Philip the Good or Charles the Bold.

The members of the Burgundian court were known to have had a preference for dark, sombre colours, and the black books can be assumed to have been designed specifically for their taste. Black books were more highly regarded than conventional illuminated books of hours, and today art historians assume they were commissioned by the court of Philip the Good. Philip's proclivity for black arose from the brutal assassination in 1419 of his father John the Fearless. The funeral procession was lined with 2000 black flags with black standards. From then on, Philip wore only black clothes as an expression of his grief. The style was adapted by other members of the court, who seem to have favoured black against gold and silver in artworks as well in formal dress, as can be seen in Rogier van der Weyden's contemporary Jean Wauquelin presenting his 'Chroniques de Hainaut' to Philip the Good. Emperor Maximilian I observed of the Burgundian rulers that their collections were "luxurious, the home treasury, and the library full of treasures, and the court ceremonial were oriented on a godlike super-elevation of the ruler."

== Attribution ==
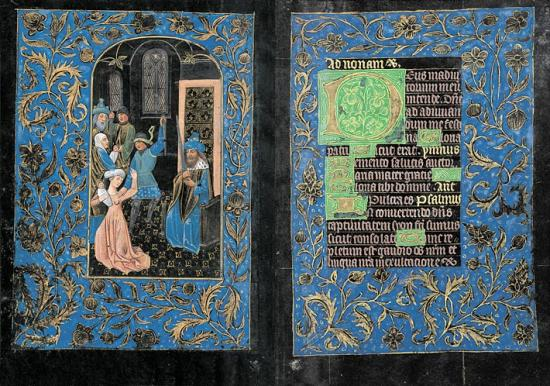
Massacre of the Innocents, folios 62v–63r; Hours of the Virgin

The manuscript does not contain any family crest to identify the donor, who, given the expense of the book and its labour-intensive production, is assumed to have been a high-ranking member of court. Feast days noted in the calendars, including for Donatian of Reims (14 October), indicate it was produced in Bruges; or, given the inclusion of the feast of Livinus (12 November), possibly in Ghent.

The artists who designed, illustrated and inscribed MS M.493 are unknown, as are the circumstances of its commission. The book is often linked to the circle of the Utrecht illuminator Willem Vrelant, who was highly regarded and successful and was active in Bruges from the 1450s until his death in 1481. This tentative attribution is based on the resemblance of some of the figures in the miniatures to those in works attributed to him; the angular and linear manner of the figures' clothes is also consistent with his style. The text "pro me peccatore" (for me, a sinner), which uses a masculine form of the Latin noun meaning "sinner", indicates that the book was produced for a man. Additionally, the inventory records of its mid-19th-century owner Nicholas Yemeniz state that it was produced by a workshop which had often been commissioned by the Burgundian Dukes.

Other possible attributions include the circle of the French painter Philippe de Mazerolles (d. 1479), or the workshop of Lieven van Lathem (active 1454–93). According to the Morgan Library, van Lathem's influence can be seen in the "figures in angular drapery [who] move somewhat stiffly in shallowly defined spaces ... [while] the men's flat faces are dominated by large noses". The style of the miniatures and borders is similar to those produced by the Galeazzo Maria Sforza in Vienna, but they are not from the same workshop.

== Description ==
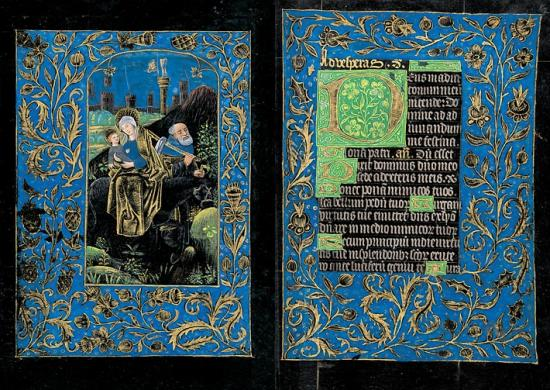
The Flight into Egypt, Folios 66v–67r

The manuscript consists of 122 pages each measuring about 17 cm × 12 cm (6.7 in × 4.7 in). The borders are mostly coloured light blue, while the illustrations are overwhelmingly dark, and of black, grey red, old rose and green pigments, with some white and flesh-tone colours. Each miniature is placed opposite the text of a prayer set against a dark background. This book's solemnity is in contrast to the bright colours found in most contemporary books of hours and seems to reflect a rather gloomy and mournful outlook. The many shades of blue were achieved from a variety of ingredients, each allowing varying depths and varieties of colour. The miniature's technique and style can be dated as around 1475. In the 15th century, Ultramarine pigment was extremely rare and worth more by weight than gold; thus its prevalence in this work is an indicator of the commissioner's wealth.

The opening letters of each prayer are formed from gold leaf on green ground. Their texts contain words from the Hours of the Cross, the Hours of the Holy Spirit, the Mass of the Virgin, the Hours of the Virgin, the Penitential Psalms, and the Office of the Dead. The lettering is in Gothic minuscule with silver ink, with gold leaf added to the rubrics. The border decorations include landscapes, jagged acanthus scrolls, birds, small animals and grotesques; the latter are similar in style to those found in the Black Hours of Galeazzo Maria Sforza, and include naked winged devils and hybrid men. They are ornamented exclusively in gold and are shaded mostly by black pigment. They are lined with yellow or gold filigree and extravagant foliage, including vines. The manuscript has deteriorated over time and has flaked in some areas.

The book was rebound in the 19th century for its then owner, the French bibliophile Nicolas Yemeniz, by the bookbinder Georges Trautz (known as Trautz-Bauzonnet), and is today encased in a wooden box, which is also modern. The binding is in tan pigskin with oxidised silver clasps. Yemeniz's monogram of two interlocking "Y"'s is stamped on the central panel of the binding and on the clasps.

== Miniatures ==
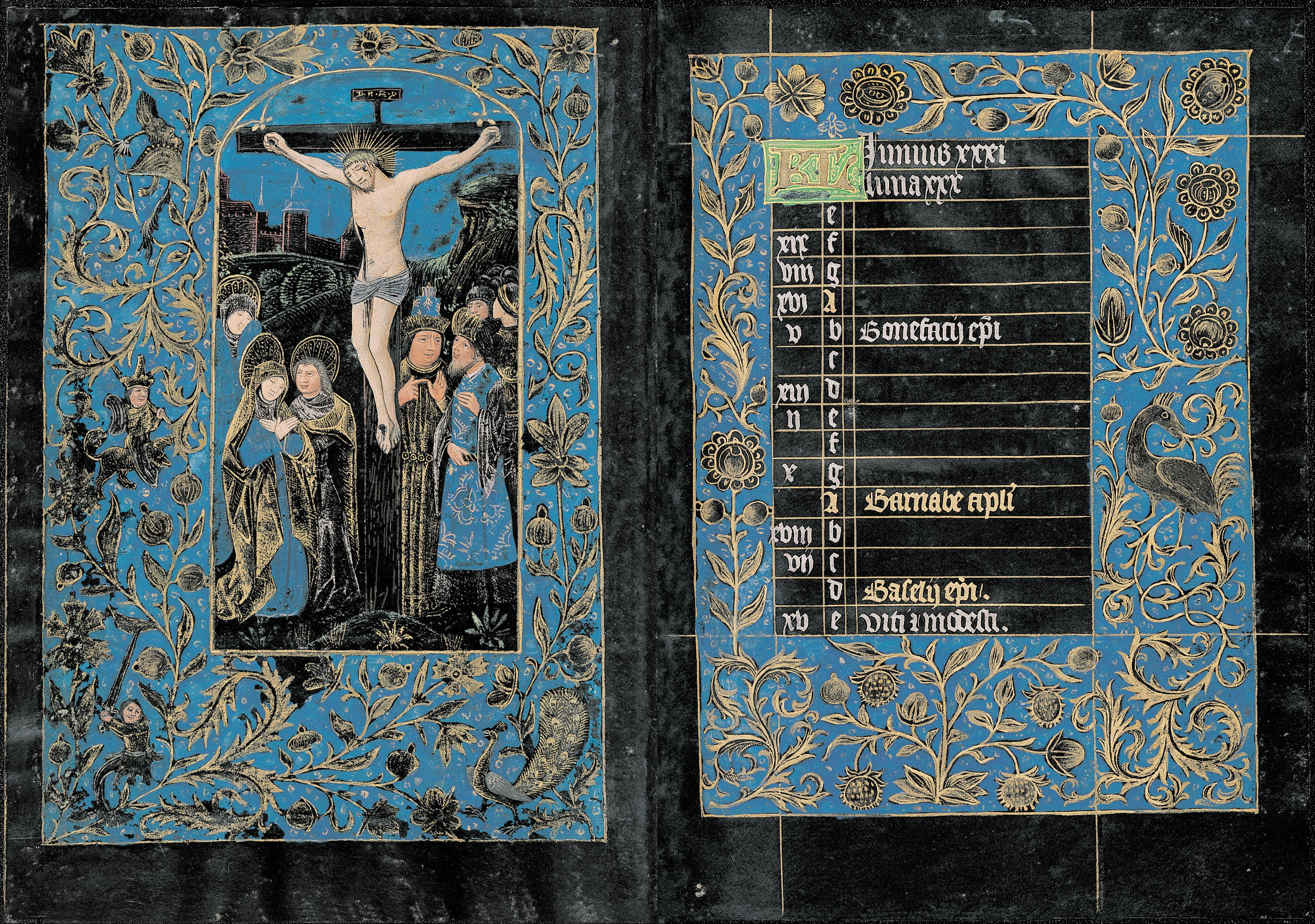
The Crucifixion, folios 14v–15r; Calendar: Hours of the Cross

The miniatures depict scenes from the lives of the Virgin and Christ and are placed to the left (verso) pages of the book, mostly against calendar representations of days from the liturgical year. The illuminations include biblical figures dressed in contemporary late medieval or Gothic dress. In folio 76v, David wears the ceremonial robes of a 15th-century monarch. The decorations on the borders are particularly vivid in detail.

The Crucifixion (folio 14v) is the book's most acclaimed illustration. It is outlined by border illustrations of fantastical creatures and a peacock. The illumination shows Jesus on the cross with his head inclined and bleeding from multiple wounds. Mary, wearing a wimpled veil, and St John stand to the left of the foot of the cross. Both have halos. The gesturing mourners to their right are given facial expressions that convey a deep sense of sadness and loss. Behind them are two soldiers wearing helmets, one of whom may be Longinus. The hilly landscape behind the figures depicts the walls of Jerusalem set against a deep blue sky. The marginalia contain hybrid men, including one who is half fish and lifts a sword, and another with animal legs.

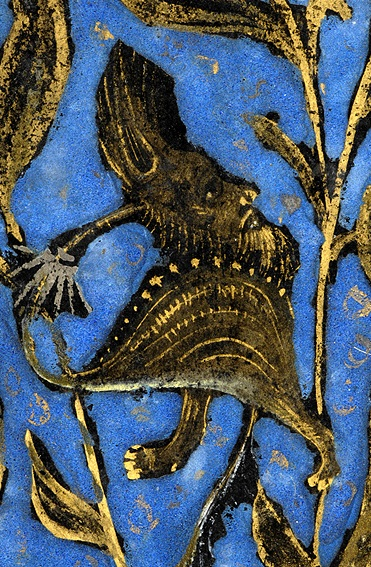
Folio 14v marginalia: Hybrid man with beard

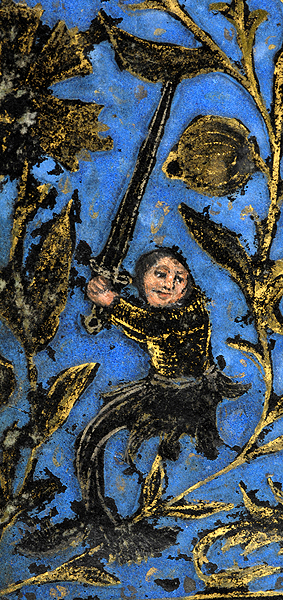
Folio 14v marginalia: Hybrid man with sword

Art historian Ingo Walther described folio 18v, which depicts the Descent of the Holy Spirit, as evidencing the "unusual, exquisite and precious overall effect ... generated by using the technique of fixing an illumination on a piece of black dyed parchment". Rinceau decorations on the edges outline a depiction of Mary at the centre of the court of the Apostles. The gilded "D" represents the opening letter of the Hours of the Holy Spirit.

The following is a complete list of the manuscript's miniatures:

- Folio 14v: The Crucifixion (opposite "Hours of the Cross")
- Folio 18v: Pentecost (opposite "Hours of the Holy Spirit: Matins")
- Folio 22v: Virgin and Child (opposite "Mass of the Virgin")
- Folio 29v: Annunciation (opposite "Hours of the Virgin: Matins")
- Folio 39v: Visitation (opposite "Hours of the Virgin: Lauds")
- Folio 50v: Nativity (opposite "Hours of the Virgin: Prime")
- Folio 54v: Annunciation to the Shepherds (opposite "Hours of the Virgin: Terce")
- Folio 58v: Adoration of the Magi (opposite "Hours of the Virgin: Sext")
- Folio 62v: Massacre of the Innocents (opposite "Hours of the Virgin")
- Folio 66v: Flight into Egypt (opposite "Hours of the Virgin")
- Folio 72v: Coronation of the Virgin (opposite "Hours of the Virgin: Compline")
- Folio 76v: David in prayer (opposite "Penitential Psalms and Litany")
- Folio 93v: Resurrection of Lazarus (opposite "Office of the Dead: Vespers")
- Folio 98v: Chanting of the Office of the Dead (opposite "Office of the Dead: Matins")

== Provenance and exhibition history ==
MS 493's early history is obscure, and there are no surviving title or inventory records before the 19th century. The arms of the family of Isabelle de Bethe is stamped on one of the pages; her family married into Burgundians and were wealthy and prominent members of Flanders society. The manuscript is described in an 1867 inventory of the collection of Nicholas Yemeniz (1806–1869), a Lyon silk manufacturer born in Constantinople. It was acquired by the French publisher and art collector Ambroise Firmin-Didot in 1871. He sold the book to Alphonse Labitte in 1879.

MS M.493 was acquired by Robert Hoe in 1909 for $500 (about $16,700 in 2025 terms). Hoe held it until 1912; following his death that year it was sold in a large scale and commercially successful sell-off of his collection of rare and antique books. It passed between two book dealers, Bernard Quaritch and Léon Gruel, before its eventual acquisition by the Pierpont Morgan Library later that year. The book was exhibited at the Paris Colonial Exhibition, the Maritime et d'art Flamand in Antwerp in 1930, at the Morgan's 50th anniversary exhibition in 1957, in Brussels in 1959, and in Bruges in 1981.

== Selected images ==
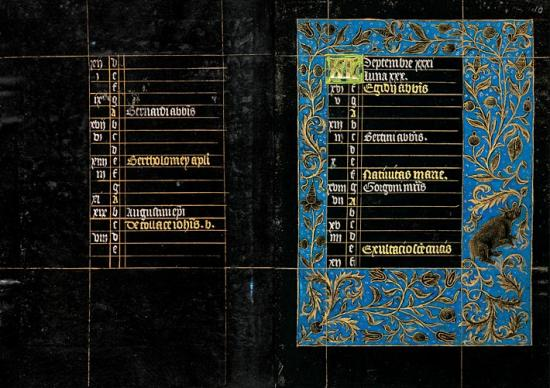
Folios. 9v–10r. Calendar: August (conclusion), opp: Calendar: September

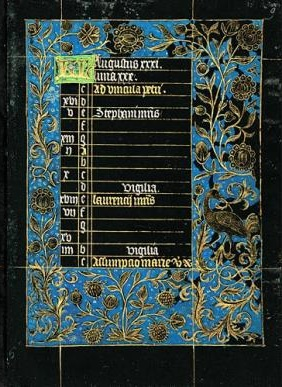
Folio 9r: Calendar: August

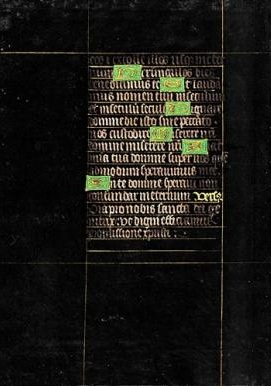
Folio 38v: Hours of the Virgin: Matins (conclusion)

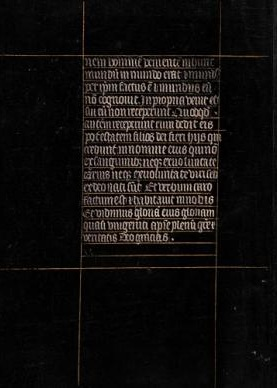
Folio 28v: Mass of the Virgin (conclusion)

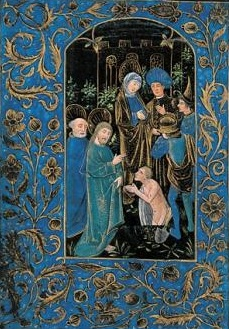
Folio 93v: Raising of Lazarus, Office of the Dead (vespers)

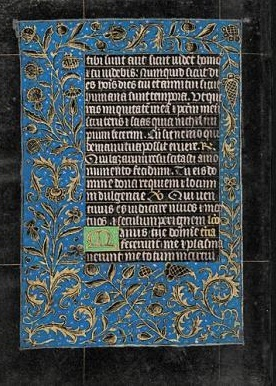
Folio 104v: Office of the Dead: Matins (first nocturns)

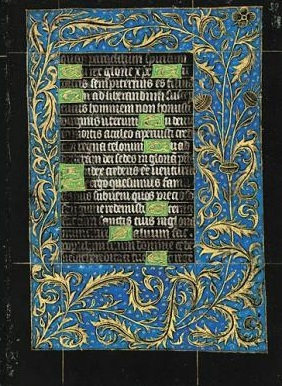
Folio 38r: Hours of the Virgin: Matins

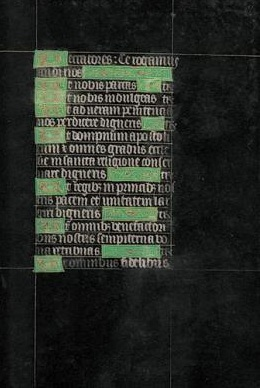
Folio 91r: Penitential Psalms and Litany
