= Philippe de Mazerolles =

Philippe de Mazerolles (c. 1420 – 1479) was a manuscript illuminator active in the Netherlands.

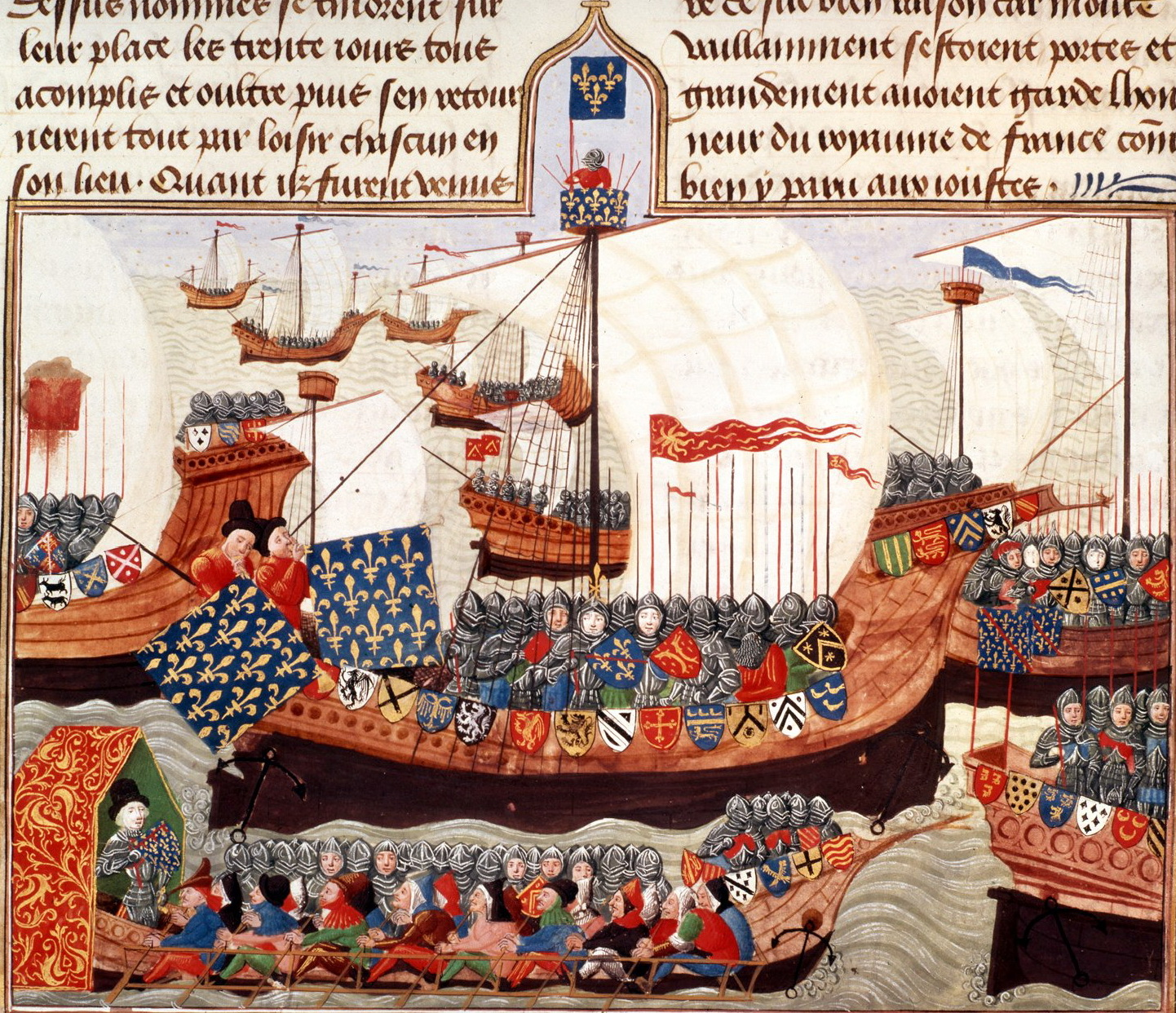
Philippe de Mazerolles's illustration of the Barbary Crusade from the Harley Froissart

Philippe was a native of Paris and received his training in France. He served as the chief illuminator of the Burgundian court under Duke Charles the Bold (r. 1467–1477). In 1467, he was named valet de chambre. In 1469, he joined the illuminators' guild of Bruges. In 1479, King Edward IV of England purchased several manuscripts from him. He died that year in Bruges.

Philippe is best known for a commission of 1467 from the town of Bruges. He was paid 420 livres parisis to complete the illustration of an unbound book of hours purchased by the town in the fiscal year 1465–1466. The book was to be a gift to Charles the Bold, then heir to the ducal throne. It is described as containing gold and silver on black parchment, but its identification with any known manuscript is disputed. It has been equated with the Hours of Mary of Burgundy, which does not match the description in the Bruges accounts, or alternatively with the Black Hours of Galeazzo Maria Sforza, which does. If the latter is correct, then the Morgan Black Hours also belong to Philippe's workshop and he is to be identified with the Master of Anthony of Burgundy.

Philippe is generally identified as the Master of the Harley Froissart, a manuscript of Froissart's Chronicles. Some sixty manuscripts have been attributed to this master. Philippe has also been identified with the Master of the Fitzwilliam 268, to whom fourteen manuscripts have been attributed.

Philippe worked closely with the Master of the Chattering Hands.
