= Black books of hours =

Medieval Flemish illuminated manuscript

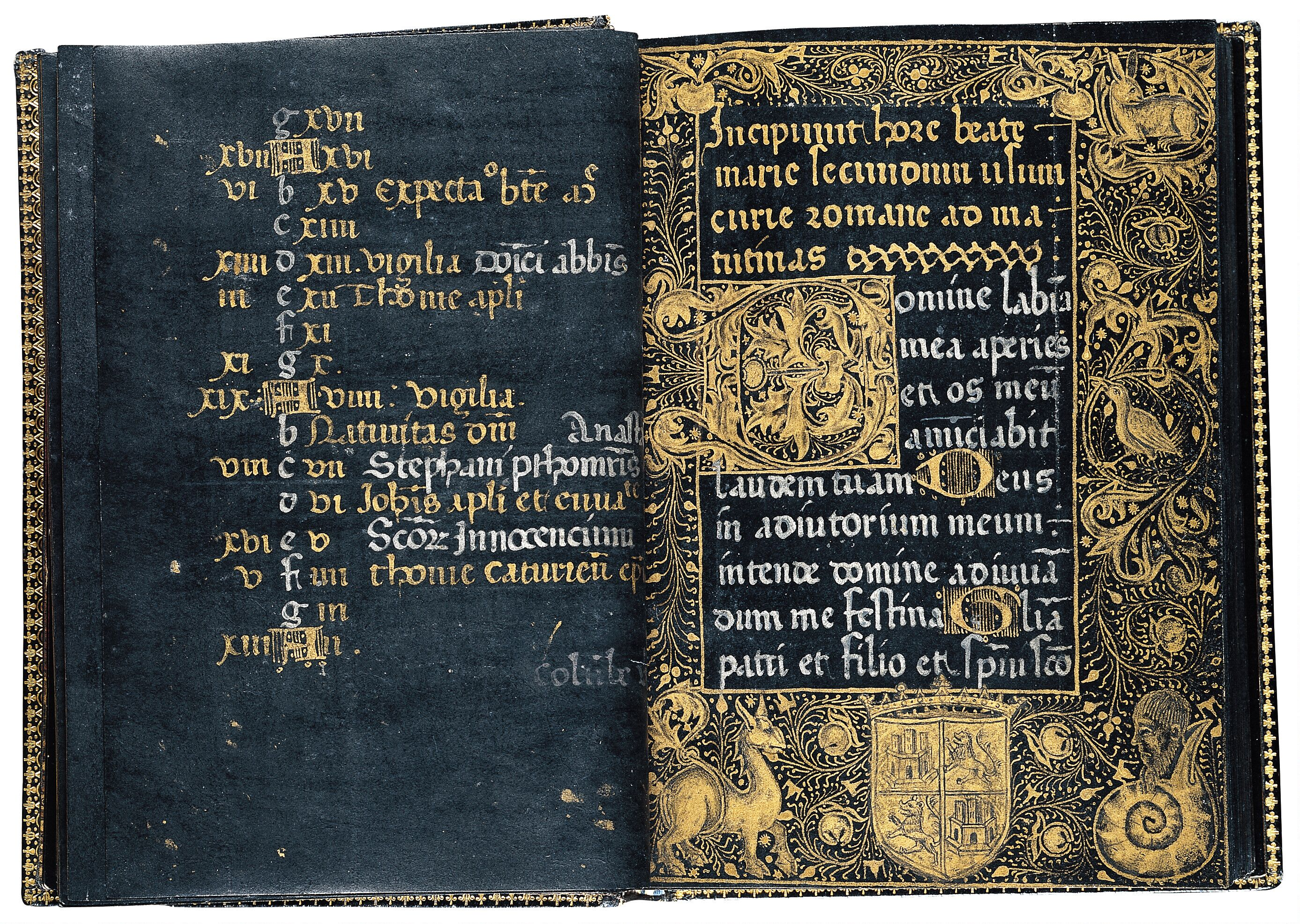
Black Hours, Hispanic Society, New York, c 1458

Black books of hours are a type of luxury Flemish illuminated manuscript books of hours using pages of vellum that were soaked with black dye or ink before they were lettered or illustrated, for an unusual and dramatic effect. The text is usually written with gold or silver ink. There are seven surviving examples, all dating from about 1455–1480.

The parchment was soaked in an iron-copper solution and as a result could only be inscribed with gold or silver lettering. The process was both expensive and corrosive to parchment, so surviving examples are few and generally in poor condition. These manuscripts were produced in the mid- to late-15th century for high-ranking members of the court of Philip the Good and Charles the Bold. Given their novel visual appeal, they were probably prized more highly than more conventional illuminated books.

The Burgundian court had a preference for dark, somber colourisation, and the extant works in this style were mostly commissioned for them. Only the wealthiest nobility could have afforded such books, and a contemporary taste for mournful colours—often reflected in the styles of the day—was reflected in the black, gold and silver of the manuscripts. Some of the miniatures in the books, notably in the Morgan Library Black Hours, are linked to a follower of Willem Vrelant due to stylistic resemblance to faces from some of his known works.

== Extant ==
The surviving manuscripts of this type include;

- Black Hours, Morgan MS 493, Morgan Library, New York
- Black Hours of Galeazzo Maria Sforza, Austrian National Library, Vienna
- (some pages only) Hours of Mary of Burgundy, Austrian National Library

== Gallery ==
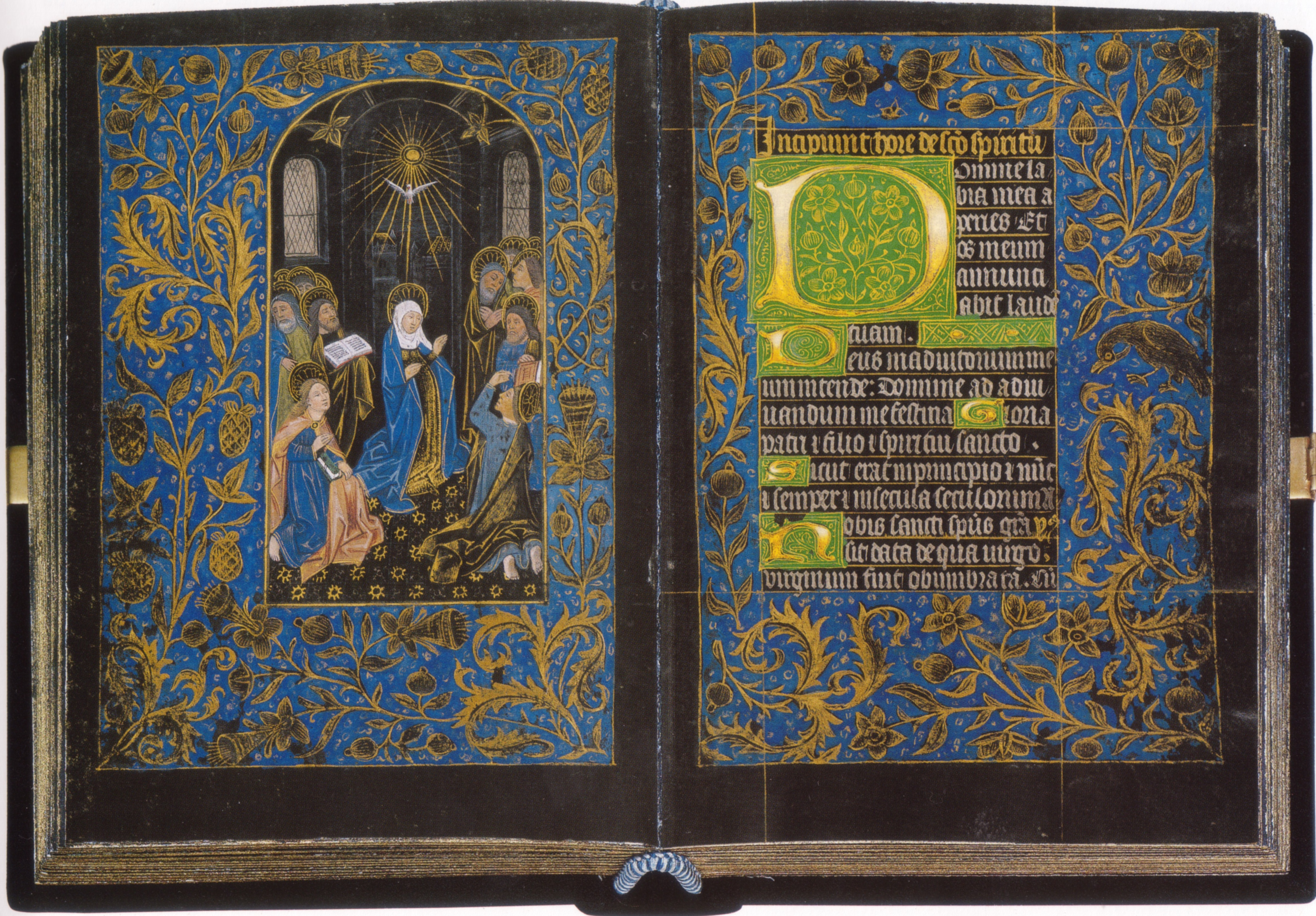
Black Hours, Morgan MS 493, Pentecost, Folios 18v, c 1475–80. Morgan Library & Museum, New York. Each folio 170 x 122 mm

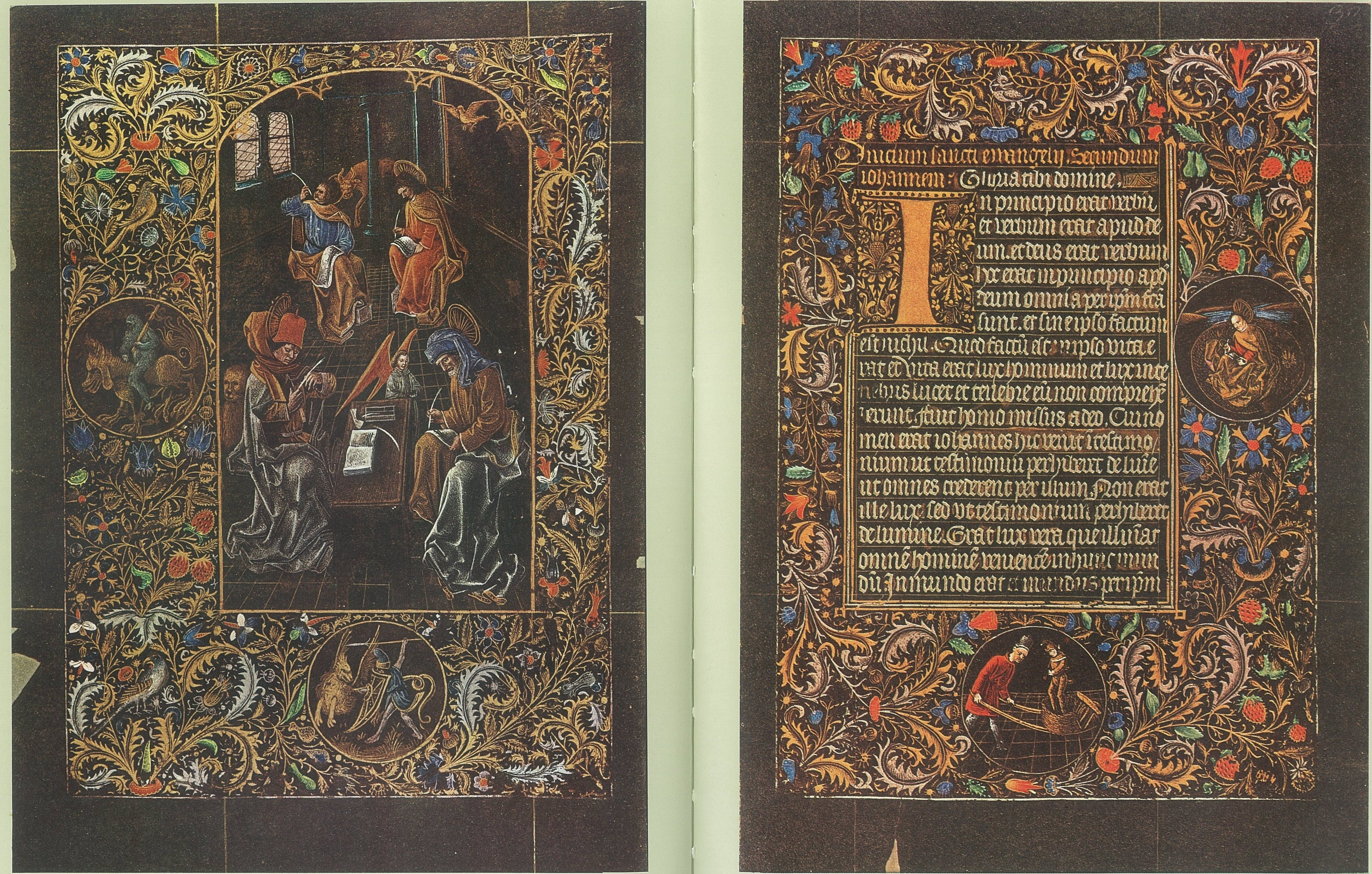
Black Hours of Galeazzo Maria Sforza; f32v, 33r. The Evangelists and John Gospels

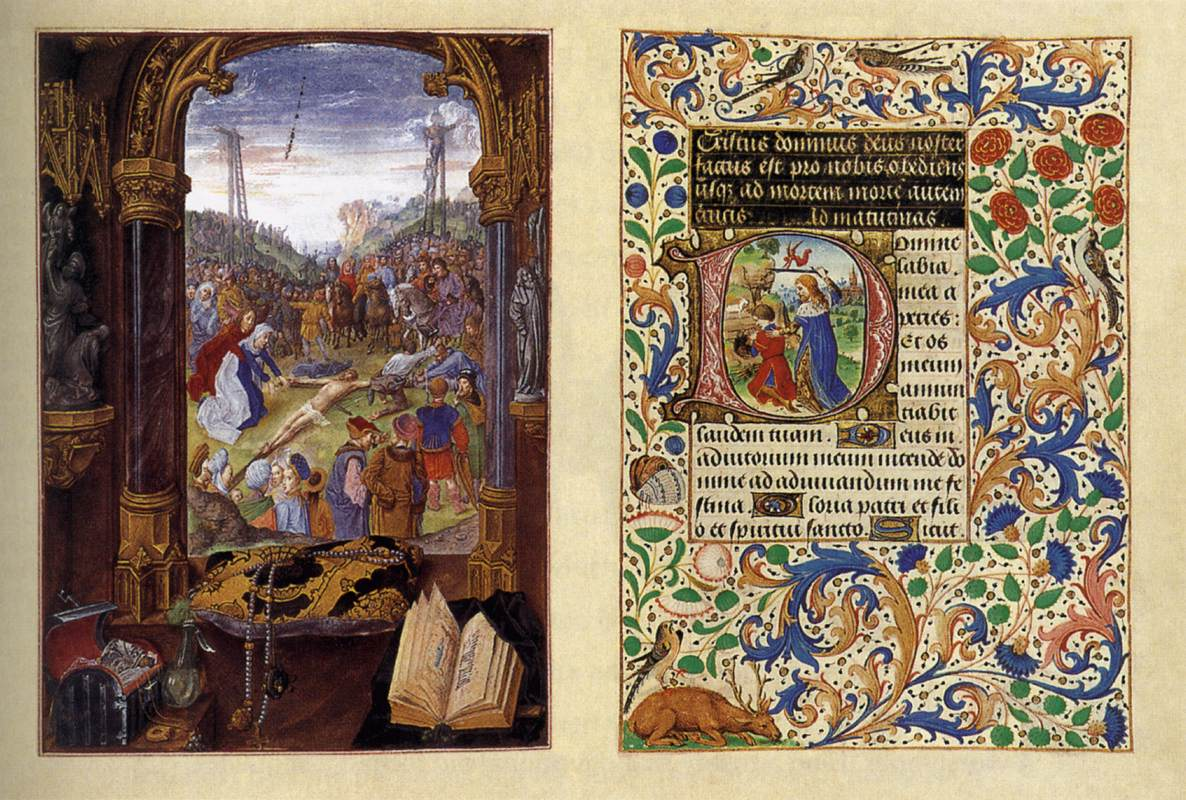
Folios from the "Hours of Mary of Burgundy", c 1477

== See also ==
- Flemish Apocalypse
