= Black Hours, Hispanic Society, New York =

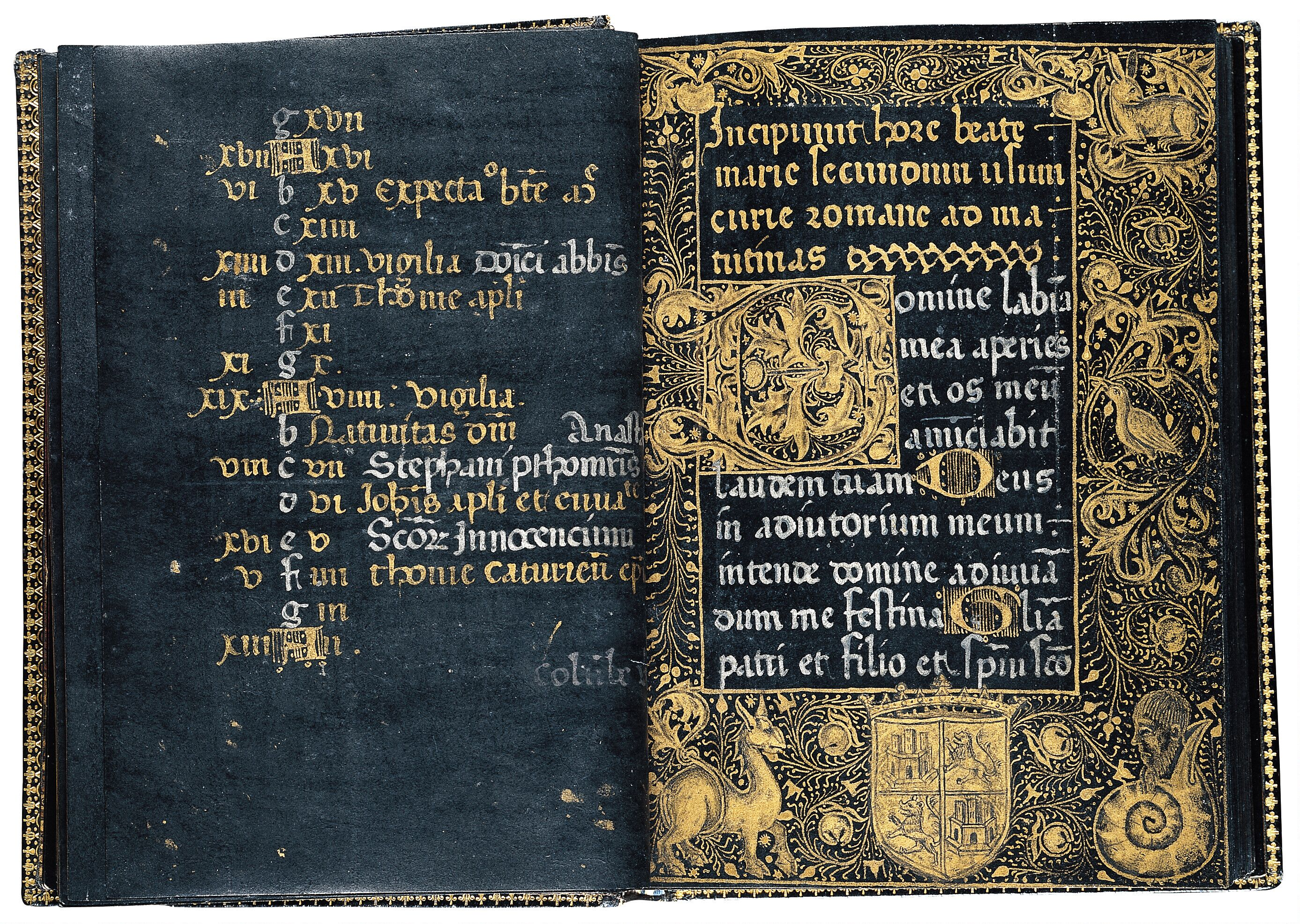
Horae Beatae Marie Secundum usum curie romane, c 1458

The Black Hours now in the collection of the Hispanic Society of America museum in New York City is a black book of hours made around 1458.

The calendar is appropriate for the Crown of Aragon, and it has been suggested that it was a bereavement gift to Maria of Castile, queen of Alfonso V of Aragon, who died in Valencia in 1458. The black vellum and the presence of Maria's coat of arms, no longer blazoned with that of Aragon, support this theory. The illuminator was Flemish, perhaps working in Spain at the time.

== Description ==
The book is an illuminated manuscript on black vellum, consisting of 152 folios, each measuring about 14.7 x 10.1 cm. The text is a version of the usual book of hours text, formally the Horae Beatae Marie Secundum usum curie romane (Hours of the Blessed Mary Following the Use of Rome).

The manuscript has space for a miniature on the page facing the start of each office. The inclusion of St. Vincent Ferrer, who was canonized in 1455, gives us a terminus post quem. Folio 13r bears the coat of arms of Castile (believed to be that of Maria of Castile).

== See also ==
- Purple parchment
