= Black Hours of Galeazzo Maria Sforza =

Illuminated manuscript

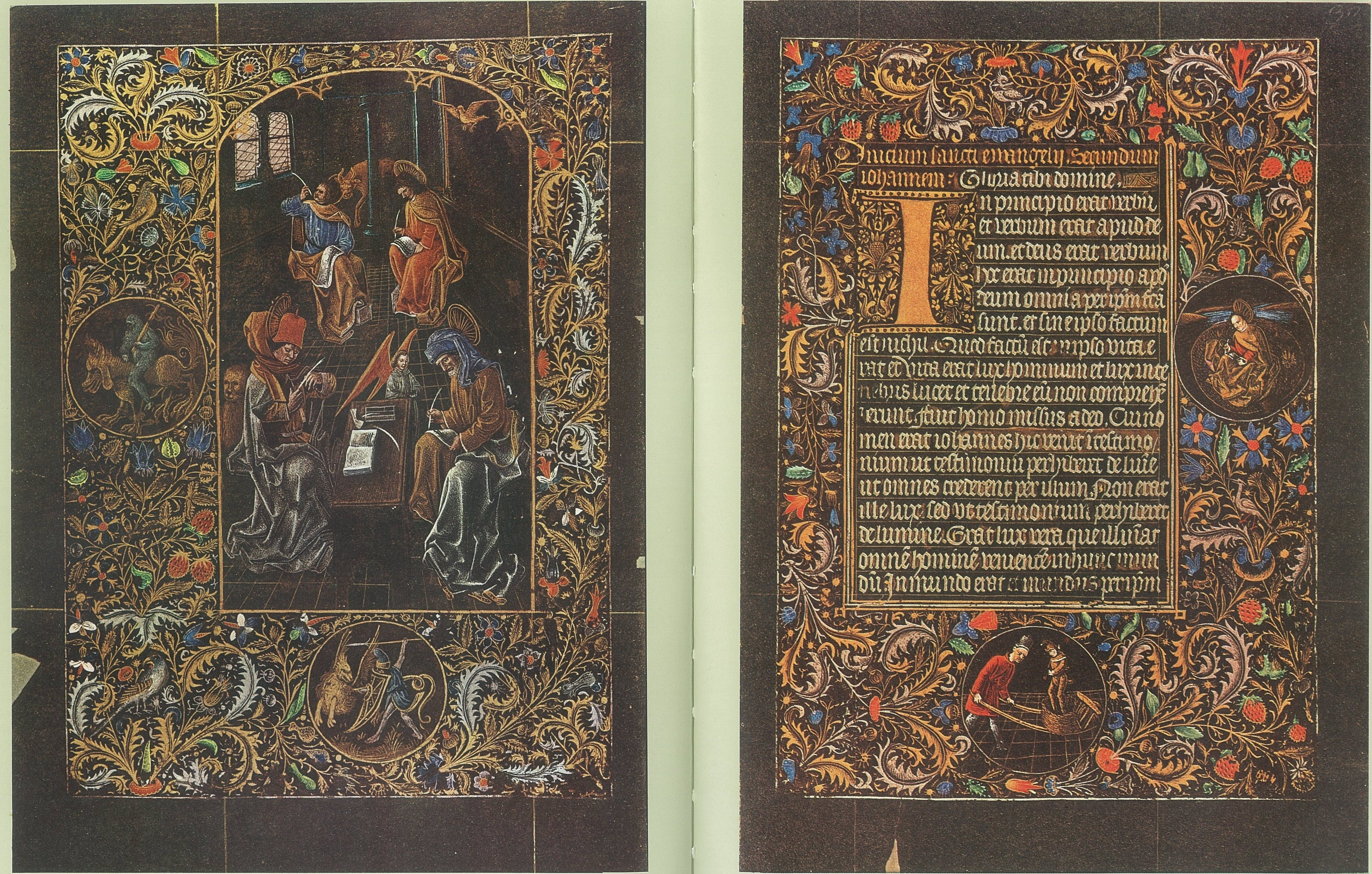
Folios from the "Black Hours of Galeazzo Maria Sforza". Celebration of the Mass

The Black Hours of Galeazzo Maria Sforza, M 1856 is an illuminated book of hours, now in the Austrian National Library in Vienna (Codex Vindobon. 1856). The book used to be the property of Galeazzo Maria Sforza, the fifth Duke of Milan. It was produced in Bruges, Flanders, probably between 1466 and 1477. Its name derives from its black borders and dark colour scheme, also found in the New York Black Hours, Morgan MS 493, and of a type favoured by the Burgundian court. It is one of about seven surviving black books of hours, all luxury books from the circle of the Burgundian court around this time. It is identified by some with the Black Hours of Charles the Bold that is mentioned in contemporary records, but others disagree.

It measures 25 by 18 centimetres (9.8 in × 7.1 in), has 154 folios and includes 15 full-page miniatures, 24 small-format miniatures, as well as 71 figurative or ornamental initials, and borders with medallions. The illuminations of the book are entirely attributed to the anonymous Master of Anthony of Burgundy. Written in Latin, it follows the Roman liturgy. The text is inscribed in gold and silver, using textus semi-quadratus, a Gothic script.

According to the historian Antoine de Schryver, this manuscript was commissioned by Charles the Bold, duke of Burgundy, and is the one mentioned in the archives of the duke, decorated by the French illuminator Philippe de Mazerolles. This hypothesis is criticized by other historians of art, who consider the Black Hours of Charles the Bold to be mostly lost, with fragments surviving in the Louvre (MI1091) and the Bibliothèque nationale de France (NAL149).

== Gallery ==
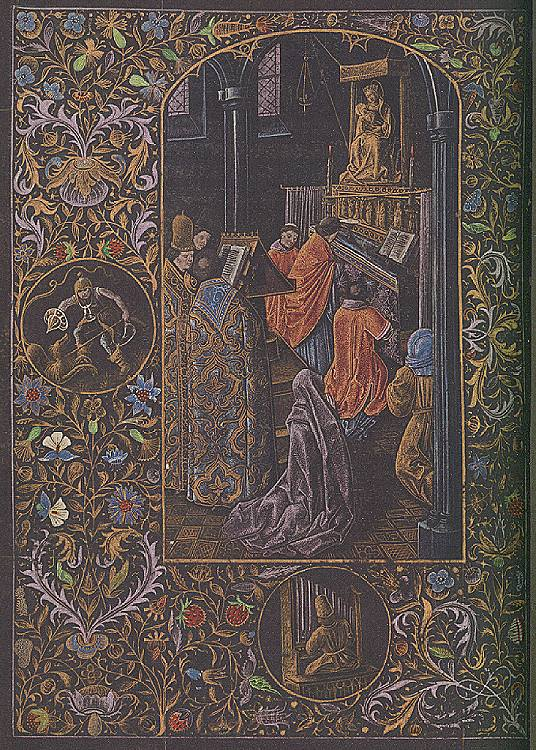
Folio 27v: Celebration of Mass

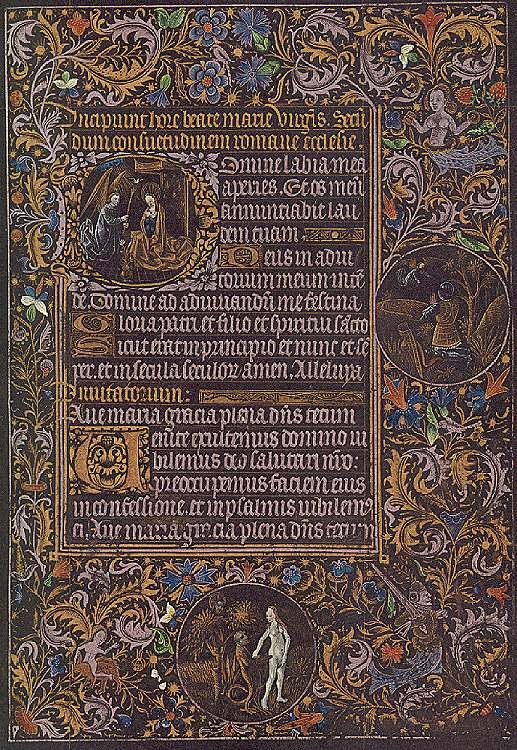
Folio 38

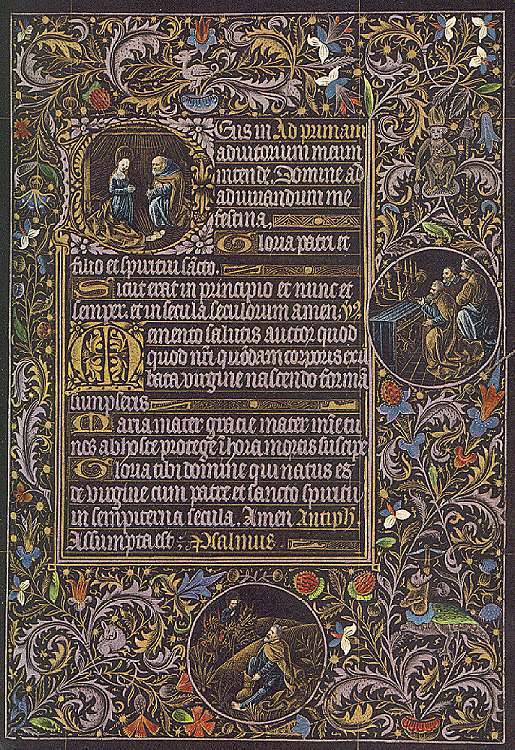
Folio 61

== Sources ==
- Bousmanne, Bernard. Miniatures flamandes. Bibliothèque nationale de France / Bibliothèque royale de Belgique, 2012. (ISBN 9782717724998),
- Jenni, Ulrike; Thoss, Dagmar. Das Schwarze Gebetbuch, Codex 1856. Frankfurt am Main: Kommentar zur Faksimile-Ausgabe, 1982.
