= Master of Anthony of Burgundy =

Flemish miniature painter

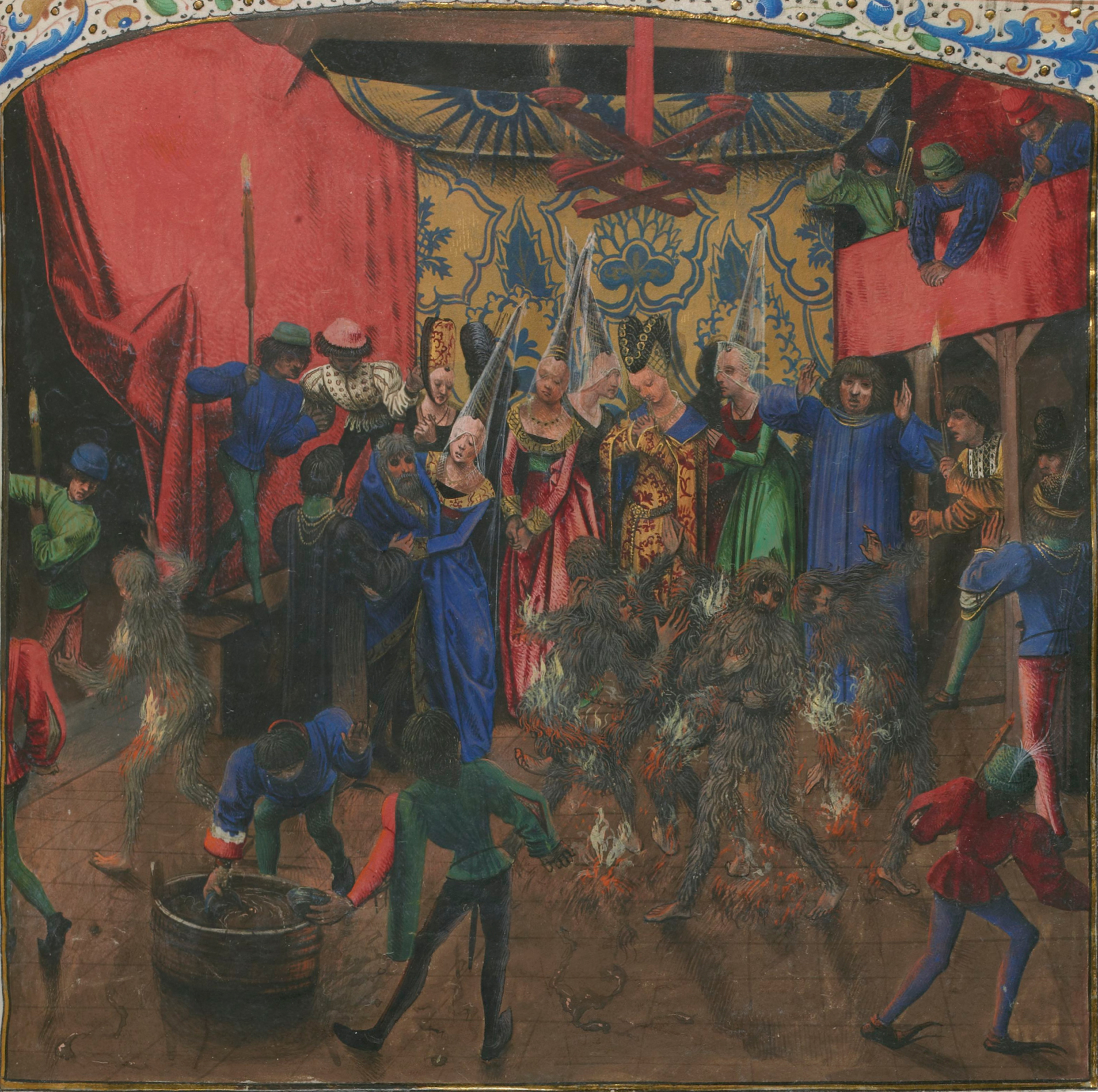
The Master's depiction from the 1470s of the Bal des Ardents, from BnF Fr 2646, shows his qualities well. Despite fading, it is "a veritable tour de force in the handling of space, forms, light and emotion"

The Master of Anthony of Burgundy was a Flemish miniature painter active in Bruges between about 1460 and 1490, apparently running a large workshop, and producing some of the most sophisticated work of the final flowering of Flemish illumination. He was first identified by Winkler in 1921; his name is derived from one of his most elevated patrons, Anthony of Burgundy, Philip the Good's illegitimate son, though he also worked for the Dukes and other bibliophiles in Burgundian court circles, who had already been allocated "Masters" by art historians. His contributions to the heavily illustrated Froissart of Louis of Gruuthuse (BnF Fr 2643–6) from the early 1470s, on which several of the leading illuminators of the day worked, show him excelling some more famous names like Loiset Lyédet. The young Master of the Dresden Prayerbook worked as his assistant on this book, suggesting he was an apprentice; a number of other anonymous masters have been postulated as his pupils. Other works are in the libraries of Paris, Wrocław, Philadelphia, Munich, Cambridge University Library and elsewhere.

He sometimes painted using gold and silver on a black background, as in the Vienna Black Hours (or Sforza Hours, amongst other titles) now in Vienna. It is through the somewhat controversial attribution of that book to him, and its further identification with a book presented to Charles the Bold — known to have been illustrated by Philippe de Mazerolles, the Frenchman appointed as Burgundian court illuminator — that he has been proposed as identical to de Mazerolles, who is documented between 1454 and 1479.

The Master, or his circle, have also been associated with the first engravings produced for book illustration, in an edition of Boccaccio printed in Bruges by Colard Mansion in about 1476.
