= Antoine de Schryver =

Antoine Philippe De Schryver (1924–2005) was a Belgian art historian and professor at the University of Ghent, where he lectured on History of Book Illumination. He was specialized in the field of illuminated manuscripts in the Southern Netherlands, 15th century painting, and artists at the Burgundian Court.

== Education and career ==
Antoine De Schryver was born in Lochristi on 27 March 1924. He studied art history and archeology at the University of Ghent and obtained his degree in 1950. From 1951, he worked as a scientific assistant at the Royal Institute for Cultural Heritage. Between 1953 and 1955, he was a candidate for the National Fund for Scientific Research, obtaining his doctoral degree in art history and archeology in 1957. In addition, he was appointed as curator of the Museum of Archeology in Ghent in that same year. He would carry out this function until 1971.

Throughout the 1950s, De Schryver obtained a number of travel scholarships, amongst which The National Trust Princess Marie-José (1951), The Belgian-Dutch Cultural Treaty (1951), and a number of the Commission mixte des échanges culturels franco-belges scholarships (1952, 1953, 1956). In 1960, De Schryver succeeded the late Frédéric Lyna as lecturer on History of Book Illumination at the University of Ghent. In addition, he succeeded the late Herman Bouchery as director of the National Centre of the History and Archeology of Books, in that same year. In 1965, he became a member of the Royal Academy of Archaeology of Belgium. At this academy, he was general secretary from 1975 till 1977, vice secretary between 1979 and 1981, and chairman from 1981 till 1983. In 1984, he became a member of the Royal Flemish Academy of Belgium for Science and the Arts.

As an art historian, De Schryver had a broad field of interest, publishing mainly on illuminated manuscripts in the Southern Netherlands, 15th century painting, and artists at the Burgundian Court. In the early 1950s, he co-authored two publications on the Ghent Altarpiece with Roger Marijnissen and Paul B. Coremans. In 1957, he defended his doctoral dissertation concerning miniaturists at the court of Charles the Bold. Furthermore, De Schryver published a study on the Hours of Mary of Burgundy, which he managed to attribute to Lieven van Lathem and the Ghent calligrapher Nicolas Spierinc. The same team collaborated on the Prayer Book of Charles the Bold, acquired in 1989 by the J. Paul Getty Museum. Upon his emeritate, De Schryver was commissioned by the Museum to write a monograph on this manuscript. The final version of the text was completed in 2004, but was only published after De Schryver's death on 9 March 2005.

The archives of De Schryver are kept by Illuminare - Centre for the Study of Medieval Art (KU Leuven), a university-led research and documentation centre. In 2005, Illuminare, with the assistance of Dr. Dominique Vanwijnsberghe, managed to acquire his archives. De Schryver left behind approximately 75 meters of text, including books, magazines, assorted documentation, slides, and pictures. His library was split up in 2006 between the libraries of the KU Leuven. His documentation, however, along with his slides and pictures, remained in Illuminare in its entirety.

== Selected bibliography ==
- De Schryver, Antoine and Marijnissen, Roger, De oorspronkelijke plaats van het Lam Gods-retabel, Les Primitifs Flamands III. Contributions à l’étude des Primitifs Flamands 1 Antwerp: De Sikkel, 1952.
- De Schryver, Antoine and Marijnissen, Roger, “Histoire matérielle,” L’Agneau Mystique au laboratoire. Examen et traitement, Paul Coremans (ed.), Les Primitifs Flamands III. Contributions à l’étude des Primitifs Flamands 2, Antwerp: De Sikkel, 1953: pp. 21–68.
- De Schryver, Antoine, De miniaturisten in dienst van Karel de Stoute, unpublished thesis, Ghent: Rijksuniversiteit Gent, Hoger Instituut voor Kunstgeschiedenis en Oudheidkunde, 1957.
- De Schryver, Antoine and Van de Velde, C., Stad Gent. Oudheidkundig Museum. Abdij van de Bijloke. Catalogus van de schilderijen, Ghent: Snoeck-Ducaju en zoon, 1972.
- De Schryver, Antoine (ed.), Miniatuurkunst, exh. cat., Ghent. Bijlokemuseum, 1975.
- De Schryver, Antoine, The Prayer Book of Charles the Bold. A Study of a Flemish Masterpiece from the Burgundian Court, transl. Jessica Berenbeim, Los Angeles: The J. Paul Getty Museum, 2008.
