= Catharsis =

Psychological event that purges emotions

Catharsis or katharsis is from the Ancient Greek word κάθαρσις, katharsis, meaning 'purification' or 'cleansing', commonly used to refer to the purification and purgation of thoughts and emotions by way of expressing them. The desired result is an emotional state of renewal and restoration.

In dramaturgy, the term usually refers to arousing negative emotion in an audience, who subsequently expels it, making them feel happier.

In Greek the term originally had only a physical meaning, describing purification practices. In medicine, it can still refer to the evacuation of the catamenia ('monthlies', menstrual fluid). Similarly, a cathartic is a substance that accelerates the defecation of faeces.

The first recorded uses of the term in a mental sense were by Aristotle in the Politics and Poetics, comparing the effects of music and tragedy on the mind of a spectator to the effect of catharsis on the body.

The term is also used in Greek to refer to the spiritual purging process that occurs in the Catholic doctrine of purgatory. Greek Neoplatonists also used the term to refer to spiritual purification.

In psychology, the term is associated with Freudian psychoanalysis where it relates to the expression of buried trauma (the cause of a neurosis), bringing it into consciousness and releasing it, increasing happiness.

== Purification ritual ==
The term kathairein (κᾰθαίρειν, 'to purify') and its relatives appear in the work of Homer, referring to purification rituals. The words kathairein and katharos (κᾰθᾰρός, 'pure') became common in Greek. It is thought that they are derived from the Semitic word qatar ('to fumigate').. In another sense, it's a cognate of Arabic "qaṭar: قطر" meaning to distill; with the noun form meaning 'drop or drip'.

Aithiopis, a later epic set in the Trojan War cycle, narrates the purification of Achilles after his murder of Thersites.

Later, the Greeks took certain new measures to cleanse away blood-guilt—"blood is purified through blood", a process in the development of Hellenistic culture in which the oracle of Delphi took a prominent role. The classic example—Orestes—belongs to tragedy, but the procedure given by Aeschylus is ancient: the blood of a sacrificed piglet is allowed to wash over the blood-polluted man, and running water washes away the blood. The identical ritual is represented, Burkert informs us, on a krater found at Canicattini, wherein it is shown being employed to cure the daughters of Proetus from their madness, caused by some ritual transgression.

To the question of whether the ritual obtains atonement for the subject, or just healing, Burkert answers: "To raise the question is to see the irrelevance of this distinction".

== Platonism ==
In Platonism, catharsis is part of the soul's progressive ascent to knowledge. It is a means to go beyond the senses and embrace the pure world of the intelligible. Specifically for the Neoplatonists Plotinus and Porphyry, catharsis is the elimination of passions. This leads to a clear distinction in the virtues. In the second tractate of the first Ennead, Plotinus lays out the difference between the civic virtues and the cathartic virtues and explains that the civic, or political, virtues are inferior. They are a principle of order and beauty and concern material existence. (Enneads, I,2,2) Although they maintain a trace of the Absolute Good, they do not lead to the unification of the soul with the divinity. As Porphyry makes clear, their function is to moderate individual passions and allow for peaceful coexistence with others. (Sentences, XXXIX) The purificatory, or cathartic, virtues are a condition for assimilation to the divinity. They separate the soul from the sensible, from everything that is not its true self, enabling it to contemplate the Mind (Nous).

== Passive psychological ==
Catharsis is a term used in dramatic art that describes a particular effect of a performance on its audience.

The first recorded use of the term being used in the mental sense was by Aristotle in his work Politics, regarding the use of music:

And since we accept the classification of melodies made by some philosophers, as ethical melodies, melodies of action, and passionate melodies, distributing the various harmonies among these classes as being in nature akin to one or the other, and as we say that music ought to be employed not for the purpose of one benefit that it confers but on account of several (for it serves the purpose both of education and of purgation [κάθαρσις]—the term purgation we use for the present without explanation, but we will return to discuss the meaning that we give to it more explicitly in our treatise on poetry—and thirdly it serves for amusement, serving to relax our tension and to give rest from it), it is clear that we should employ all the harmonies, yet not employ them all in the same way, but use the most ethical ones for education, and the active and passionate kinds for listening to when others are performing (for any experience that occurs violently in some souls is found in all, though with different degrees of intensity—for example pity and fear, and also religious excitement; for some persons are very liable to this form of emotion, and under the influence of sacred music we see these people, when they use tunes that violently arouse the soul, being thrown into a state as if they had received medicinal treatment and taken a purge [καθάρσεως]; the same experience then must come also to the compassionate and the timid and the other emotional people generally in such degree as befalls each individual of these classes, and all must undergo a purgation [κάθαρσις] and a pleasant feeling of relief; and similarly also the purgative [κάθαρσιν] melodies afford harmless delight to people). (As translated by Harris Rackham)

In his treatise on poetry, Poetics, he describes the relief brought about by a staged tragedy:

We must now treat of tragedy after first gathering up the definition of its nature which results from what we have said already. Tragedy is, then, a representation of an action that is heroic and complete and of a certain magnitude—by means of language enriched with all kinds of ornament, each used separately in the different parts of the play: it represents men in action and does not use narrative, and through pity and fear it effects relief [κάθαρσις] to these and similar emotions. [As translated by Harris Rackham]

=== Purgation or purification? ===
In his works prior to the Poetics, Aristotle had usually used the term catharsis purely in its literal medical sense (usually referring to the evacuation of the katamenia—the menstrual fluid or other reproductive material) from the patient. F. L. Lucas opposes, therefore, the use of words like purification and cleansing to translate catharsis; he proposes that it should rather be rendered as purgation. "It is the human soul that is purged of its excessive passions."

Gerald F. Else made the following argument against the "purgation" theory:

It presupposes that we come to the tragic drama (unconsciously, if you will) as patients to be cured, relieved, restored to psychic health. But there is not a word to support this in the "Poetics", not a hint that the end of drama is to cure or alleviate pathological states. On the contrary it is evident in every line of the work that Aristotle is presupposing "normal" auditors, normal states of mind and feeling, normal emotional and aesthetic experience.

Lessing (1729–1781) sidesteps the medical attribution. He interprets catharsis as a purification (German: Reinigung), an experience that brings pity and fear into their proper balance: "In real life", he explained, "men are sometimes too much addicted to pity or fear, sometimes too little; tragedy brings them back to a virtuous and happy mean." Tragedy is then a corrective; through watching tragedy, the audience learns how to feel these emotions at proper levels.

G. F. Else argues that traditional, widely held interpretations of catharsis as "purification" or "purgation" have no basis in the text of the Poetics, but are derived from the use of catharsis in other Aristotelian and non-Aristotelian contexts. For this reason, a number of diverse interpretations of the meaning of this term have arisen. The term is often discussed along with Aristotle's concept of anagnorisis.

Elizabeth Belfiore held an alternate view of catharsis as an allopathic process in which pity and fear produce a catharsis of emotions unlike pity and fear, which she described in her book, Tragic Pleasures: Aristotle on Plot and Emotion.

=== Intellectual clarification ===
In the twentieth century a paradigm shift took place in the interpretation of catharsis: a number of scholars contributed to the argument in support of the intellectual clarification concept. The clarification theory of catharsis would be fully consistent, as other interpretations are not, with Aristotle's argument in chapter 4 of the Poetics (1448b4-17) that the essential pleasure of mimesis is the intellectual pleasure of "learning and inference".

It is generally understood that Aristotle's theory of mimesis and catharsis represent responses to Plato's negative view of artistic mimesis on an audience. Plato argued that the most common forms of artistic mimesis were designed to evoke from an audience powerful emotions such as pity, fear, and ridicule which override the rational control that defines the highest level of our humanity and lead us to wallow unacceptably in the overindulgence of emotion and passion. Aristotle's concept of catharsis, in all of the major senses attributed to it, contradicts Plato's view by providing a mechanism that generates the rational control of irrational emotions. Most scholars consider all of the commonly held interpretations of catharsis, purgation, purification, and clarification to represent a process in which pity and fear accomplish the catharsis of emotions like themselves.

D. W. Lucas, in an authoritative edition of the Poetics, comprehensively covers the various nuances inherent in the meaning of the term in an Appendix devoted to "Pity, Fear, and Katharsis". Lucas recognizes the possibility of catharsis bearing some aspect of the meaning of "purification, purgation, and 'intellectual clarification,'" although his approach to these terms differs in some ways from that of other influential scholars. In particular, Lucas's interpretation is based on "the Greek doctrine of Humours", which has not received wide subsequent acceptance. The conception of catharsis in terms of purgation and purification remains in wide use today, as it has for centuries. However, since the twentieth century, the interpretation of catharsis as "intellectual clarification" has gained recognition in describing the effect of catharsis on members of the audience.

=== Attempts to avoid passive catharsis ===
There have been, for political or aesthetic reasons, deliberate attempts made to subvert the effect of catharsis in theatre.

For example, Bertolt Brecht viewed catharsis as a pap (pabulum) for the bourgeois theatre audience, and designed dramas which left significant emotions unresolved, intending to force social action upon the audience. Brecht then identified the concept of catharsis with the notion of identification of the spectator, meaning a complete adhesion of the viewer to the dramatic actions and characters. Brecht reasoned that the absence of a cathartic resolution would require the audience to take political action in the real world, in order to fill the emotional gap they had experienced vicariously. This technique can be seen as early as his agit-prop play The Measures Taken, and is mostly the source of his invention of an epic theatre, based on a distancing effect (Verfremdungseffekt) between the viewer and the representation or portrayal of characters.

Brazilian dramatist Augusto Boal, inventor of the Theater of the Oppressed, which seeks to eliminate the distinction between spectator and actor, also considers this kind of catharsis "something very harmful". "In me, too, and in everyone else, there is the power to change. I want to release and develop these skills. The bourgeois theater oppresses them."

== Active and conversational psychological ==
=== Psychoanalysis ===
Jakob Bernays was a German philosopher who wrote books about Aristotle's views of drama in 1857 and 1880. These prompted a lot of writing about catharsis in the German-speaking world.

In this environment, Austrian psychiatrist Josef Breuer developed a cathartic method of treatment using hypnosis for persons who have intensive hysteria in the early 1890s. While under hypnosis, Breuer's patients were able to recall traumatic experiences, and through the process of expressing the original emotions that had been repressed and forgotten (and had formed neuroses), they were relieved of their neurotic hysteria symptoms. Breuer became a mentor to fellow Austrian psychiatrist Sigmund Freud (who was married to Bernays' niece). Breuer and Freud released the book Studies on Hysteria in 1895. This book explained the cathartic method to the world, and was the first published work about psychoanalysis.

The injured person's reaction to the trauma only exercises a completely 'cathartic' effect if it is an adequate reaction as, for instance, revenge. But language serves as a substitute for action; by its help, an affect can be 'abreacted' almost as effectively.

As Freud developed psychoanalysis, catharsis remained a central part of it. After trying hypnotherapy and finding it wanting, Freud replaced it with free association.

The term cathexis has also been adopted by modern psychotherapy, particularly Freudian psychoanalysis, to describe the act of experiencing the deep emotions associated with events in the individual's past which had originally been repressed or ignored, and had never been adequately addressed or experienced.

=== Psychodrama ===
Psychodrama involves people expressing themselves using spontaneous dramatization, role playing, and dramatic self-presentation to investigate and gain insight into their lives. Psychodrama includes elements of theater, often conducted on a stage, or a space that serves as a stage area, where props can be used.

The therapy was developed by American Jacob Moreno (a psychiatrist previously from Romania and Austria) and later also his wife Zerka Moreno (a psychologist previously from the Netherlands and the UK). Jacob was a contemporary of Freud, but rejected many of his ideas of psychoanalysis. He developed psychodrama in New York from 1925. In 1929, he founded an Impromptu Theater at Carnegie Hall. In 1936, he founded the Beacon Hill Sanitarium, and the adjacent Therapeutic Theater. The Morenos established the Psychodramatic Institute in New York in 1942.

A psychodrama therapy group, under the direction of a psychodramatist, reenacts real-life, past situations (or inner mental processes), acting them out in present time. Participants then have the opportunity to evaluate their behavior, reflect on how the past incident is getting played out in the present and more deeply understand particular situations in their lives.

Other forms of cathartic drama therapy have since been developed, including Theater of the Oppressed.

Playback Theatre is a form of improvisational theatre in which audience or group members tell stories from their lives and watch them enacted on the spot. This can have therapeutic uses.

There are additionally other forms of expressive therapies which make use of various kinds of art.

=== Primal therapy ===
Primal therapy is a trauma-based psychotherapy created by American psychologist Arthur Janov, who argues that neurosis is caused by the repressed pain of childhood trauma. Janov argues that repressed pain can be sequentially brought to conscious awareness for resolution through re-experiencing specific incidents and fully expressing the resulting pain during therapy. Primal therapy was developed as a means of eliciting the repressed pain; the term Pain is capitalized in discussions of primal therapy when referring to any repressed emotional distress and its purported long-lasting psychological effects. Janov criticizes the talking therapies as they deal primarily with the cerebral cortex and higher-reasoning areas and do not access the source of Pain within the more basic parts of the central nervous system.

Primal therapy is used to re-experience childhood pain—i.e., felt rather than conceptual memories—in an attempt to resolve the pain through complete processing and integration, becoming real. An intended objective of the therapy is to lessen or eliminate the hold early trauma exerts on adult behaviour.

=== Social catharsis ===
Emotional situations can elicit physiological, behavioral, cognitive, expressive, and subjective changes in individuals. Affected individuals often use social sharing as a cathartic release of emotions.

Bernard Rimé studies the patterns of social sharing after emotional experiences. His works suggest that individuals seek social outlets in an attempt to modify the situation and restore personal homeostatic balance. Rimé found that 80–95% of emotional episodes are shared. The affected individuals talk about the emotional experience recurrently to people around them throughout the following hours, days, or weeks. These results indicate that this response is irrespective of emotional valence, gender, education, and culture. His studies also found that social sharing of emotion increases as the intensity of the emotion increases.

If emotions are shared socially and elicits emotion in the listener then the listener will likely share what they heard with other people. Rimé calls this process "secondary social sharing". If this repeats, it is then called "tertiary social sharing".

==== Stages ====
Émile Durkheim proposed emotional stages of social sharing:

1. Directly after emotional effects, the emotions are shared. Through sharing, there is a reciprocal stimulation of emotions and emotional communion.
2. This leads to social effects like social integration and strengthening of beliefs.
3. Finally, individuals experience a renewed trust in life, strength, and self-confidence.

==== Motives ====
Affect scientists have found differences in motives for social sharing of positive and negative emotions.

A study by Christopher Langston found that individuals share positive events to capitalize on the positive emotions they elicit. Reminiscing the positive experience augments positive affects like temporary mood and longer-term well-being. A study by Shelly Gable et al. confirmed Langston's "capitalization" theory by demonstrating that relationship quality is enhanced when partners are responsive to positive recollections. The responsiveness increased levels of intimacy and satisfaction within the relationship. In general, the motives behind social sharing of positive events are to recall the positive emotions, inform others, and gain attention from others. All three motives are representatives of capitalization.

Bernard Rimé studies suggest that the motives behind social sharing of negative emotions are to vent, understand, bond, and gain social support. Negatively affected individuals often seek life meaning and emotional support to combat feelings of loneliness after a tragic event.

==== Reactions to emotional events ====
When communities are affected by an emotional event, members repetitively share emotional experiences. After the 2001 New York and the 2004 Madrid terrorist attacks, more than 80% of respondents shared their emotional experience with others. According to Bernard Rimé, every sharing round elicits emotional reactivation in the sender and the receiver. This then reactivates the need to share in both. Social sharing throughout the community leads to high amounts of emotional recollection and "emotional overheating".

James Pennebaker and Kent Harber defined three stages of collective responses to emotional events:

1. a state of "emergency" takes place in the first month after the emotional event. In this stage, there is an abundance of thoughts, talks, media coverage, and social integration based on the event.
2. the "plateau" occurs in the second month. Abundant thoughts remain, but the amount of talks, media coverage, and social integration decreases.
3. the "extinction" occurs after the second month. There is a return to normalcy.

==== A critical perspective of collective catharsis ====
Frantz Fanon, in his book Black Skin, White Masks, provides a multi-dimensional and critical analysis of the manifestations and implications of colonial racism in early 1900 France, including a critical conceptualization of collective catharsis within the context of colonial states. Fanon’s perspective on collective catharsis highlights the psychological impact of cultural and social narratives on white as well as black individuals in European-colonized contexts, exploring how these narratives serve as a means of channeling collective aggression and establishing social norms and attitudes that perpetuate racial stereotypes and negative self-perceptions among black individuals.

Intertwining social psychology and psychoanalysis, Fanon conceptualizes collective catharsis as a release of aggressive impulses, "a channel, an outlet through which the forces accumulated in the form of aggression can be released", and analyzes how this aggressive release manifests for the white colonizers in the 'civilized' context. In an era where overtly cruel acts of racism such as lynching and slavery are frowned upon and no longer a commonplace reality, Fanon explores how the white population finds more subtle outlets for their aggressive impulses through acts of collective catharsis.

Did the little black child see his father beaten or lynched by a white man? Has there been a real traumatism? To all of this we have to answer no. Well, then?

If we want to answer correctly, we have to fall back on the idea of collective catharsis.

Fanon highlights how popular entertainment, such as children's magazines or comic books, often portrays "Evil Spirits" as black individuals and other racialized figures and thereby serves as a cathartic release for the collective aggression of the white colonizers. In these stories, the socially unacceptable racist desires of white individuals are sublimated through fiction and pop culture, allowing for the dehumanization and derogation of black individuals. And so too, in this way, are the establishment of social norms and attitudes that perpetuate racial stereotypes argued as acts of collective catharsis by the dominant white hegemony.

Fanon underscores that because the black individual is immersed in this white-centric hegemonic state, they are implicated in this collective catharsis as not only the target of the aggressive release but also as the perpetrators. In engagement with these derogatory fictions or channels of collective catharsis, the black individual identifies with the white hero and encourages their defeat of the 'uncivilized' black antagonists. This co-perpetration and identification with the white protagonists (of fiction and society) results in the black individual internalizing these oppressive narratives, thereby developing an incongruence between their actual and ideal selves that is inherently unbreachable.

=== Journal therapy ===
Journal therapy causes someone to achieve psychological catharsis through writing about their experiences. Americans Ira Progoff and James Pennebaker are two notable practitioners, each having written extensively on this and related topics.

=== Effects ===
This cathartic release of emotions is often believed to be therapeutic for affected individuals. Many therapeutic mechanisms have been seen to aid in emotional recovery. One example is "interpersonal emotion regulation", in which listeners help to modify the affected individual's affective state by using certain strategies. Expressive writing is another common mechanism for personal catharsis. Joanne Frattaroli published a meta-analysis suggesting that written disclosure of information, thoughts, and feelings enhances mental health.

There has been much debate about the use of catharsis in the reduction of anger. Some scholars believe that "blowing off steam" may reduce physiological stress in the short term, but this reduction may act as a reward mechanism, reinforcing the behavior and promoting future outbursts. However, other studies have suggested that using violent media may decrease hostility under periods of stress.

Legal scholars have linked personal "catharsis" to "closure" (an individual's desire for a firm answer to a question and an aversion toward ambiguity) and "satisfaction" which can be applied to affective strategies as diverse as retribution, on one hand, and forgiveness on the other.

Some studies question the benefits of social catharsis. Catrin Finkenauer and colleagues found that non-shared memories were no more emotionally triggering than shared ones. Other studies have also failed to prove that social catharsis leads to any degree of emotional recovery. Emmanuelle Zech and Bernard Rimé asked participants to recall and share a negative experience with an experimenter. When compared with the control group that only discussed unemotional topics, there was no correlation between emotional sharing and emotional recovery.

Some studies even found adverse effects of social catharsis. Contrary to the Frattaroli study, David Sbarra and colleagues found expressive writing to greatly impede emotional recovery following a marital separation. Similar findings have been published regarding trauma recovery. A group intervention technique is often used on disaster victims to prevent trauma-related disorders. However, meta-analysis showed negative effects of this cathartic "therapy".

== See also ==
- Abreaction – Psychoanalytical term
- Closure (psychology) – Psychological term for one's need for an answer to something
- Dissociation (psychology) – Feeling of detachment from reality
- Hesychasm – Eastern Christian contemplative prayer
- Kenosis – Christian theological concept
- Kairosis
- Sublimation (psychology) – Psychological defense mechanism
- Theories of humor – Conjectures explaining humor
