= Master of Mary of Burgundy =

Manuscript illuminator from the Southern Netherlands

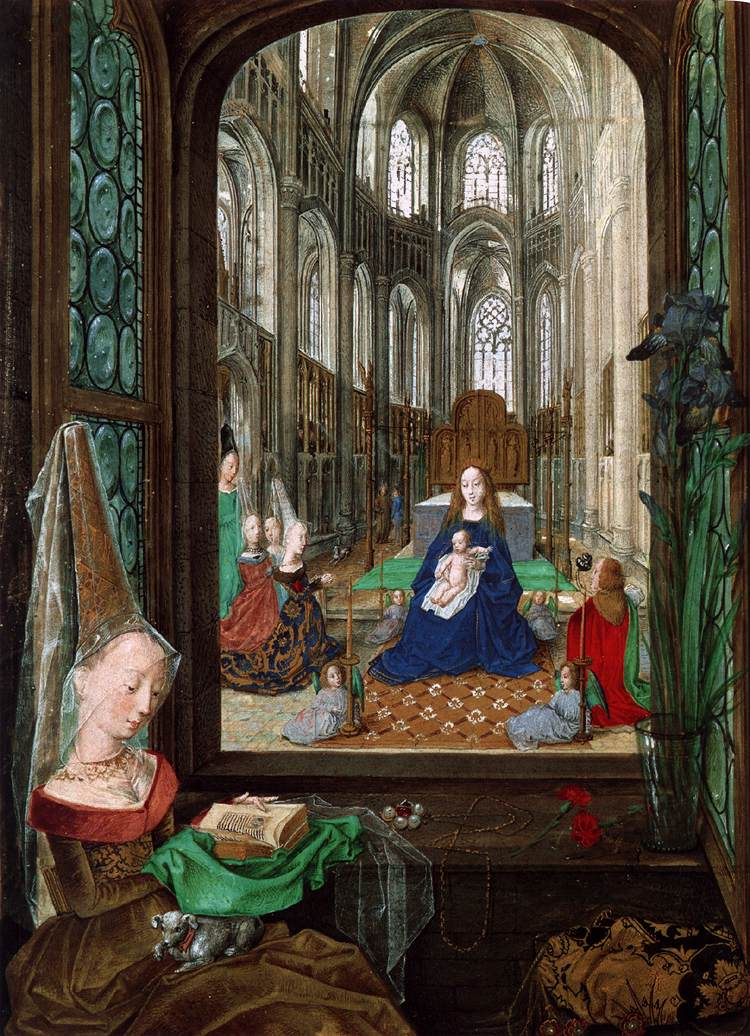
Folio from the "Hours of Mary of Burgundy"

The Master of Mary of Burgundy was a Flemish illuminator, painter and draughtsman active between 1469 and 1483 in Flanders, probably in Ghent. His notname is derived from two books of hours attributed to him, the Vienna Hours of Mary of Burgundy and another book of hours, now in Berlin, also for Mary of Burgundy.

He was influenced by advances in oil on canvas panel painting, especially the works and approach of Hugo van der Goes, and may have been also a painter himself. His illuminations are characterised by a tendency towards a dark palette, an aesthetic favoured by the court of the time, as well as innovative uses of trompe-l'œil devices in both his miniatures and border decorations. While relatively few works have been attributed to him, the master is regarded as one of the chief innovators of late 15th-century manuscript illumination.

== Attribution ==
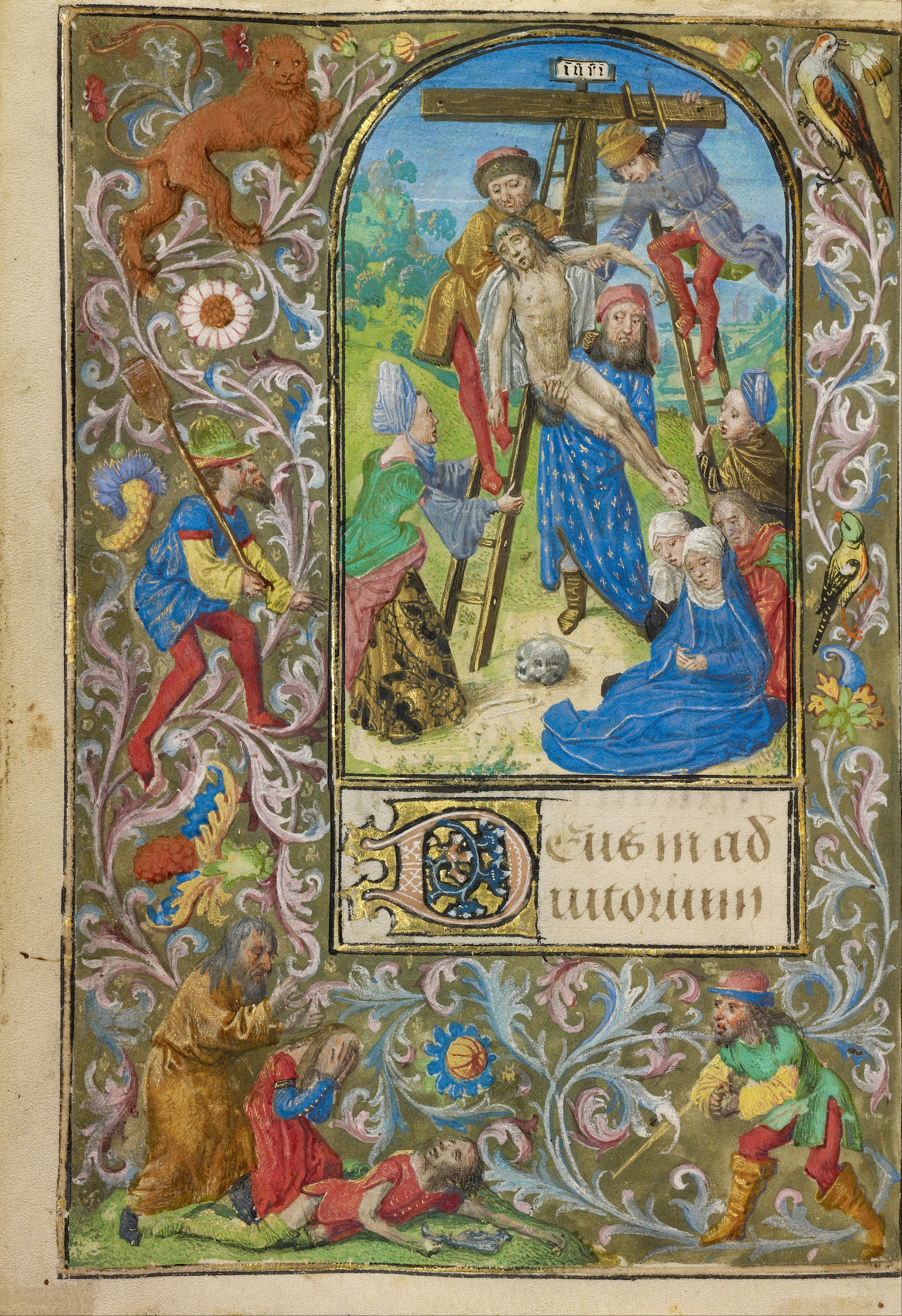
Livre de prière de Charles le Téméraire, J. Paul Getty Museum, Ms. 37. La Déposition de croix, fol. 111v

One of the most talented and innovative artists of his generation, he is known to have been influenced by contemporary panel painters, including van der Goes, Justus van Gent, Rogier van der Weyden, and Jan van Eyck, although in tone and style only, direct figurative borrowings are rare, and he may himself have been a panel painter - both van Eyck and Rogier are known to have worked on illuminations.

Other works attributed to the master include miniatures in the Prayer Book of Charles the Bold (Ms. 37) in the J. Paul Getty Museum, and the Hours of Engelbert of Nassau in the Bodleian Library, in Oxford.

== Style ==
During his career, he made a number of iconographic and formal innovations, and is today seen as the main innovator in bringing about a new style of Flemish illumination in the 1470s and 1480s. He was highly regarded by wealthy and powerful patrons in his lifetime, and followed by a great number of imitators. A small number of extant drawings are also attributed to him.

The master's illustrations in the Hours of Mary of Burgundy can be characterised by the use of everyday devotional objects, including books and rosary beads, as well as domestic settings, to frame images of the Virgin and Child, thereby bringing the sacred into domestic, earthly spaces.

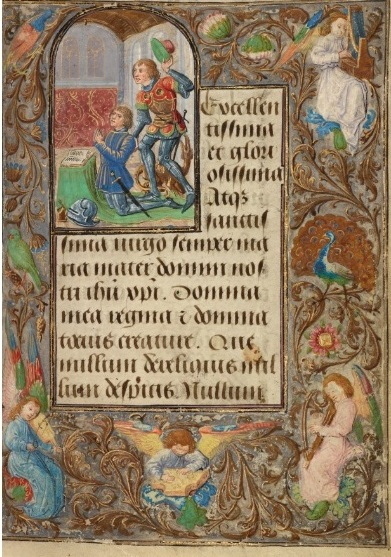
From the Book of Charles the Bold

He achieved the modelling of figures and objects by building layers of paint in thin but visible strokes, rather than the then-conventional method of hatching. One of his characteristic techniques was to place religious scenes behind a window, create an illusion of depth, and make the scene in the background the main focus of interest. The two best-known examples of this are the "Virgin and Child" and "Christ nailed to the Cross" miniatures in the Mary of Burgundy book.

The master collaborated with a number of artists of the earlier generation, including Lieven van Lathem, Simon Marmion and Nicolas Spierinc, but soon surpassed them.

== Sources ==
- Pächt, Otto. "The Master of Mary of Burgundy". The Burlington Magazine for Connoisseurs, Volume 85, No. 501, 1944
- Pächt, Otto.The Master of Mary of Burgundy, Faber & Faber, 1948
- van Buren, Anne. "The Master of Mary of Burgundy and His Colleagues: The State of Research and Questions of Method". Zeitschrift für Kunstgeschichte, 38. Bd., H. 3/4, 1975
- Walther, Ingo. Codices Illustres. Berlin: Taschen Verlag, 2001. ISBN 978-3-8228-6023-6
- Woods, Kim. Viewing Renaissance Art. Yale University Press, 2007. ISBN 978-0-3001-2343-2
