= Hans Nieuwdorp =

Belgian art historian (born 1944)

Hans Nieuwdorp (born 1944) is a Belgian art historian specialized in late medieval sculpture. In 2000, he was appointed director of the Art Museums of the City of Antwerp (including the Museum Mayer van den Bergh and the Rubens House).

== Education ==
Nieuwdorp was a pupil of the Saint John Berchmans College in Brussels. At the University of Leuven, he studied archaeology and history of art. During this time, he specialized in numismatics (supervised by P. Naster) and sculpture (supervised by Jan Karel Steppe). He submitted a thesis examining Adriaan Waterloos, and obtained a Masters in 1969. Following his MA, he studied museum management.

== Career ==
Around 1968-69, Nieuwdorp was given the position of Special Assignment Holder in the Vleeshuis Museum (Antwerp), where he focused his attention on the numistic collection. From 1969 onward, he worked as a scientific associate at the Royal Museums for Fine Arts, and was responsible for the sculpture department. He equally acted as a curator for the exhibitions; "Pieter Bruegel" (1969) and "De Beeldhouwkunst in de Eeuw van Rubens" (1977). In 1976, Nieuwdorp became adjunct-curator of the Art Historical Museums Antwerp, and the Museum Mayer van den Bergh. He subsequently became head curator in 1981 and director in 2000.

Nieuwdorp also became a member of various societies and committees. He was, among other things, secretary general of the Belgian society of museums (1975–76), and the Belgian National ICOM committee. He was secretary of the Flemish Museum Society and president of the Museum Council of the Flemish Community (1987–88). Nieuwdorp was also a member of the scientific committee of various national and international exhibitions. In this capacity, he organized, among others, ‘Jordaens’ (1993), 7 Middelheim-Biennales (1980, 82, 84, 86, 88, 90, 92), ‘Antwerp Altarpieces’ (1993), ‘Antwerps Masters from the Hermitage’ (1968), ‘Jan Boeckhorst’ (1990), and ‘Juan de Flandes’ (2011).

In 2014, Nieuwdorp donated his complete collection of documentation on 15th- and 16th-century South Netherlandish altarpieces to Illuminare – Centre for the Study of Medieval Art (KU Leuven). In the course of 2015, Illuminare will catalogue and make available his documentation for research purposes.
