= Dissoi logoi =

Ancient Greek rhetorical exercise

The Dissoi logoi (Greek δισσοὶ λόγοι, "contrasting arguments") is a text, a rhetorical exercise of unknown authorship, most likely dating to just after the Peloponnesian War (431–404 BC) based on comments within. The exercise is intended to help an individual gain deeper understanding of an issue by forcing them to consider it from the angle of their opponent, which may serve either to strengthen their argument or to help the debaters reach compromise.

== Dating and authorship ==
The composition date of the work is unknown; scholars have historically looked to the text itself for clues as to its origin, a method that produces only ambiguous results at best. The work is largely written in the Doric dialect, but contains small examples of the Attic and Ionian dialects as well. One possible clue as to the date of the work is the mention of the offspring of Polyclitus, a well-known Greek sculptor. In the Dissoi Logoi (section 6.8), it is stated that Polyclitus taught his son (singular) virtue, or ἀρετή. However, in Protagoras 328c, the usually attentive Plato claims Polyclitus to have in fact two sons, not just one. The Protagoras' dramatic events are conventionally dated to between 429 and 422 BC, so either one of the authors made a mistake in listing the genealogy of Polyclitus, or the Dissoi Logoi was written before Polyclitus had another son, thus dating it to before the 420s BC. Another interesting reference possibly dating the text is its mention of a victory of Sparta over Athens and her allies in section 1.8. At face value, most tend to accept this as a reference to the Peloponnesian War, and thus claim that the Dissoi Logoi must have been written after this war's terminal date, 404 BC. While this is most probably true, it is by no means sure, because there are other instances of Spartan victory over Athens which add uncertainty to this dating, such as the Battle of Tanagra in 457 BC. Thus the Dissoi Logoi is generally dated to between the 5th and early 4th centuries BC.

== Interpretation ==
What cannot be denied is the confounding nature with which the Dissoi Logoi conveys its message. For instance, in the very first chapter, the author states that "some say that what is good and what is bad are two different things, others that they are the same thing... I myself side with the latter group." Yet, by the end of this chapter, it has changed to "I am trying rather to point out that it is not the same thing which is bad and good, but that each is different from the other."

Rosamond Sprague argues that good and bad cannot be the same and are, in fact, different from each other, exemplifying this by examining the concept of war; if both good and bad were the same, then by doing a great deal of harm, one would also be doing the opposing side the greatest of good. Dissoi Logoi, also called dialexeis, is a two-fold argument, which considers each side of an argument in hopes of coming to a deeper truth. It is similar to a form of debate with oneself and holds that contradiction is an inevitable consequence of discourse. Daniel Silvermintz notes that while the Dissoi Logoi purports to offer a consideration of both the absolutist and relativist positions, the latter chapters defending the sophists demonstrate its allegiance to the relativist position.

=== Rhetoric ===
In ancient Greece, students of rhetoric would be asked to speak and write for both sides of a controversy. Rhetorician John Poulakos sees the concept of Dissoi Logoi as the ability or practice of providing a contrary argument at any point on any issue. He says that people must be persuaded to one side or the other in order to act, and this is accomplished through Dissoi Logoi. Edward Schiappa put the concept into the following form: "X can be Y and not-Y."

There are many 5th and 4th century BC works that touch upon similar concepts mentioned in the Dissoi Logoi. The Dissoi Logoi's attempt to argue an issue from both sides is reminiscent of Plato's Protagoras, which was presumably written after the Dissoi Logoi. It could be that the Dissoi Logoi could have been derived from Protagoras himself, and may have even been an influence on Plato while he was writing his Protagoras. A definite parallel can be drawn between the thoughts of Protagoras as recounted by Plato, and the rhetorical methods used in the Dissoi Logoi. The exercise considers demonstrating contrasting arguments in a single oration a method of demonstrating skill. Protagoras stated that every argument had two contradicting sides, both of which could be argued. This idea emphasizes the power and versatility of language. Dissoi Logoi considers that rhetoric can be situational. On the true purpose of the Dissoi Logoi, one scholar writes "it could be a serious, and hence disappointingly bad treatise; a heavy-handed spoof of such (Sophist) works; a workbook for dialecticians...It is almost impossible to say anything about the Dissoi Logoi that goes beyond mere conjecture."

The Dissoi Logoi speaks in detail about the acquisition of language in humans, which is ultimately determined to be learned, not inherent (6.12). The author comes to this conclusion through the question, "What if a Greek child is born in Greece and immediately sent to live in Persia?", with the answer being that the child would speak Persian, not Greek, and therefore language must be learned. A similar debate is waged in Herodotus's Histories 2.2, where an Egyptian king, Psammetichus, attempts to determine the world's first language by raising two newborns completely in lack of language. The children independently begin to speak Phrygian, which is then determined to be the first language of man. Both Herodotus, and the author of the Dissoi Logoi seem to have invested thought into the developments of language.

== Publication ==
All surviving manuscript copies of Dissoi Logoi are appended to manuscripts of the works of the Pyrrhonist philosopher Sextus Empiricus. Dissoi Logoi was first published by Stephanus in 1570, as an appendix to his edition of Diogenes Laërtius, where it is divided into five chapters. Thomas Gale first published a version of it with a commentary of his own in 1671. The first edition with an apparatus criticus was published by Ernst Weber in 1897.

== Bibliography ==
- T. M. Robinson (ed.), Contrasting Arguments: An Edition of the Dissoi Logoi, London, Arno Press, 1979.
