= Willem Vrelant =

Dutch book illuminator

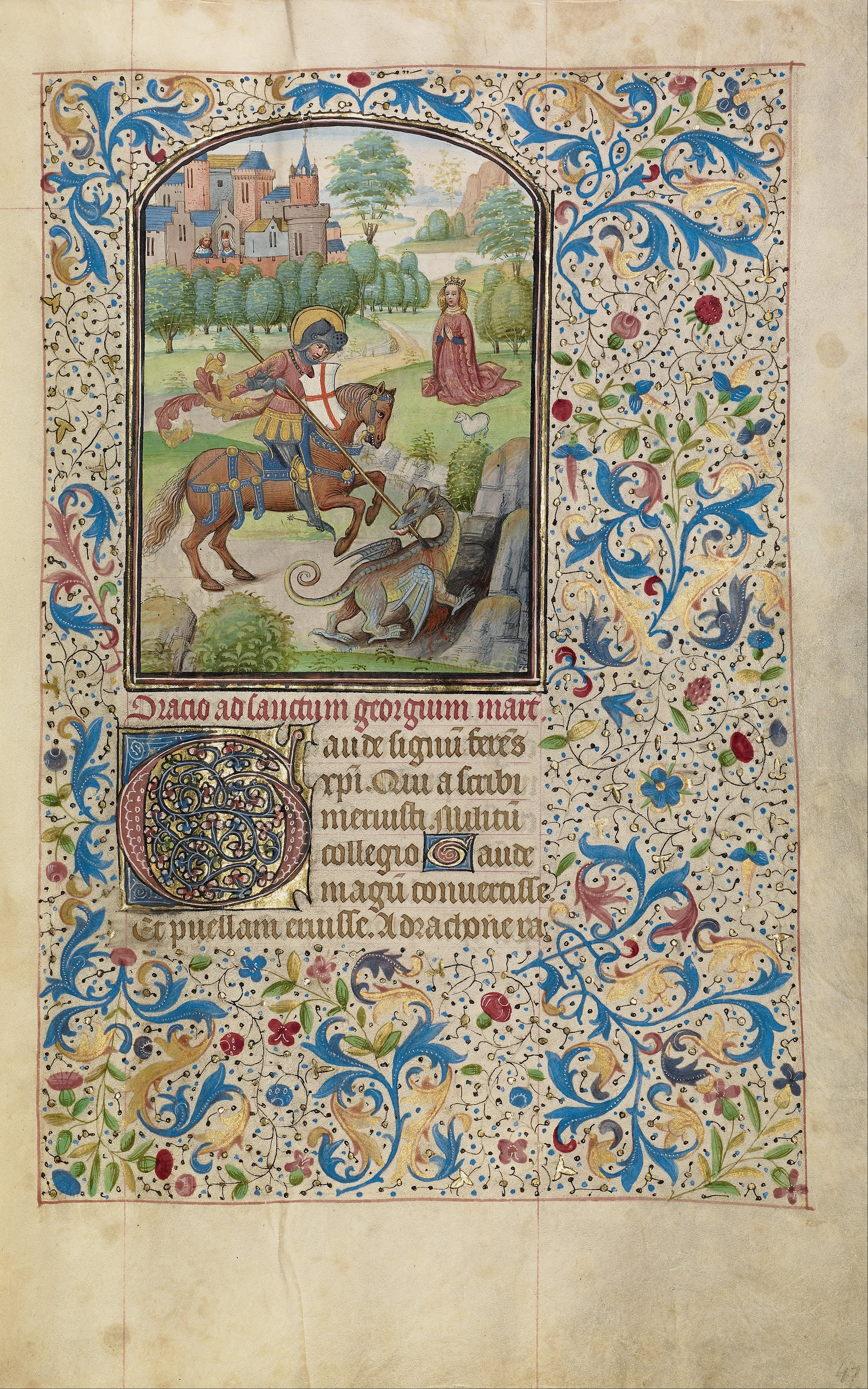
Saint George and the Dragon by Vrelant

Willem Vrelant (died c. 1481/1482) was a Dutch book illuminator.

== Life ==
He is first registered in 1449, when an illuminator from Vreeland named Willem Backer obtained citizenship of Utrecht. He may have lived in Utrecht for years, as in 1450 he finished there the Hours of William de Montfort. From 1454 to 1481 he is recorded as a member of the Bruges guild of bookmakers. His large and productive workshop produced (among others) a book of hours which is now in Baltimore (1455–60), the Hours of Isabella of Castille (c.1460), the Chronicles of Hainaut (1468) and individual miniatures in the Hours of Mary of Burgundy (c.1480).

Following Vrelant's death, his widow inherited his workshop. Madame Vrelant ran the studio alongside Elisabeth Scepens, one of his former pupils.

== See also ==
- Book of Hours of Leonor de la Vega - work imputed to Vrelant
- Très Riches Heures du Duc de Berry - famous French book of hours
- A Man Praying to the Holy
- Solomon Praying to the Holy Spirit

== Bibliography ==
- (in German) Ingo F. Walther, Norbert Wolf: Meisterwerke der Buchmalerei, S. 480. Köln u.a., Taschen 2005, ISBN 3-8228-4747-X
