= Elisabeth Scepens =

Flemish artist and bookmaker (fl. 1476)

Elisabeth Scepens (also Elizabeth Scepens; fl. 1476) was a Flemish bookmaker and artist.

Elisabeth Scepens lived in Bruges, Flanders, in the late 15th century. Alongside Adrien Raet, she is one of two pupils known to have studied under the illuminator Willem Vrelant. Vrelant taught manuscript illustration and book production in Bruges, and archives of the studio list Scepens as one of his students in 1476. Following his death in 1481, his widow inherited his workshop. Together with Scepens, Madame Vrelant ran the prolific studio, which produced portrait miniatures, calligraphy and capital letter decoration for manuscripts.

In 1476, Scepens gained membership in the St. John the Evangelist Guild for scribes, illuminators and bookbinders. Her membership was renewed annually until 1489. While it is possible that works attributed to Vrelant or his followers were actually by Scepens, no works of hers are known. Scepens was part of the Northern Renaissance, and along with Margaret van Eyck, is one of the few known 15th-century Flemish women artists.
