= Book of Hours of Leonor de la Vega =

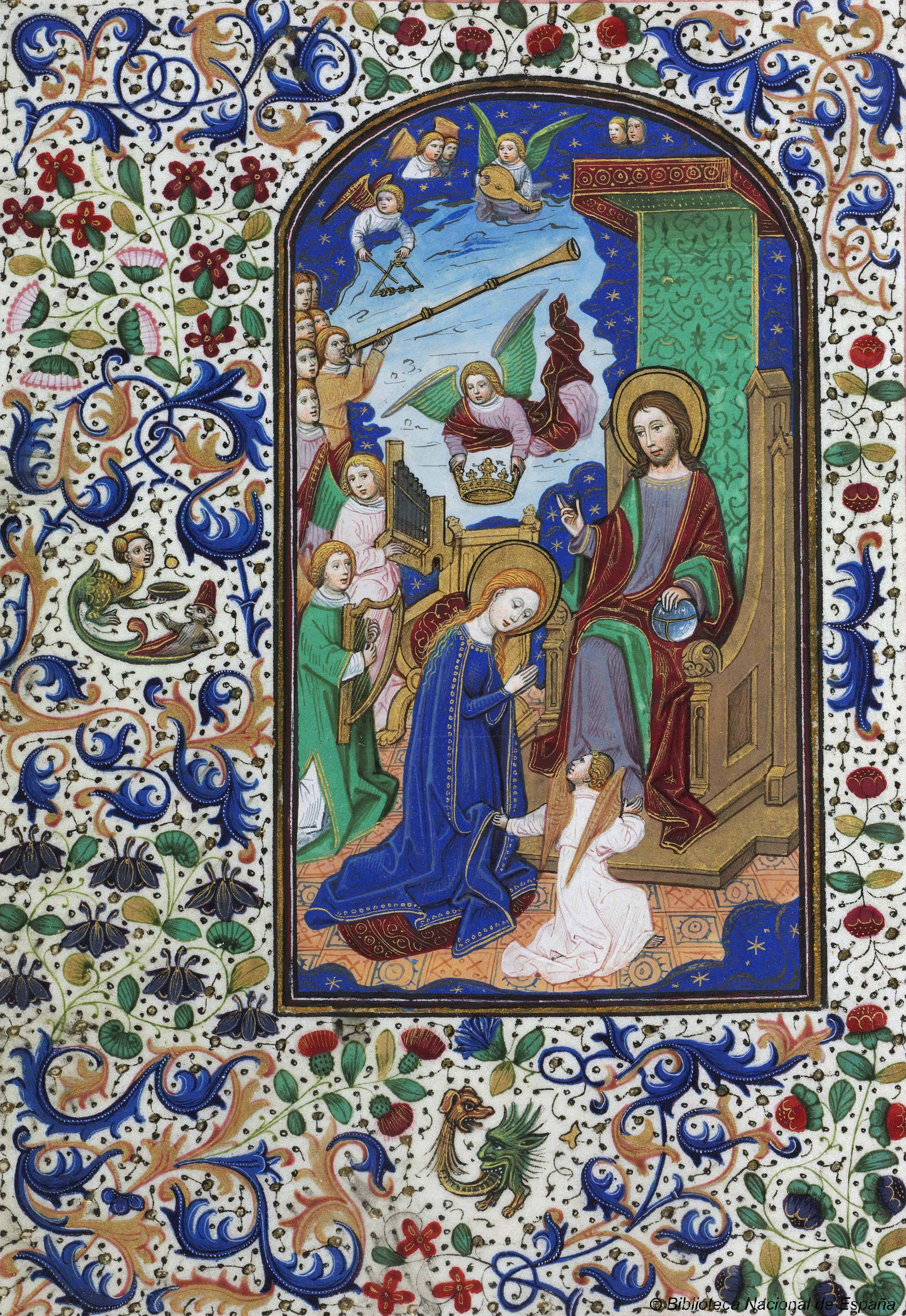
- Author: Willem Vrelant
- Original title: Libro de horas de Leonor de la Vega
- Series: Vitr/24/2
- Publication date: 1465
- Media type: ink and illumination on parchment
- National Library of Spain

The Book of Hours of Leonor de la Vega is a codex of illuminated manuscript on vellum by Willem Vrelant. It is in the National Library of Spain (Vitr.24-2). The pages are 19 x 13 centimeters in size.

== History ==
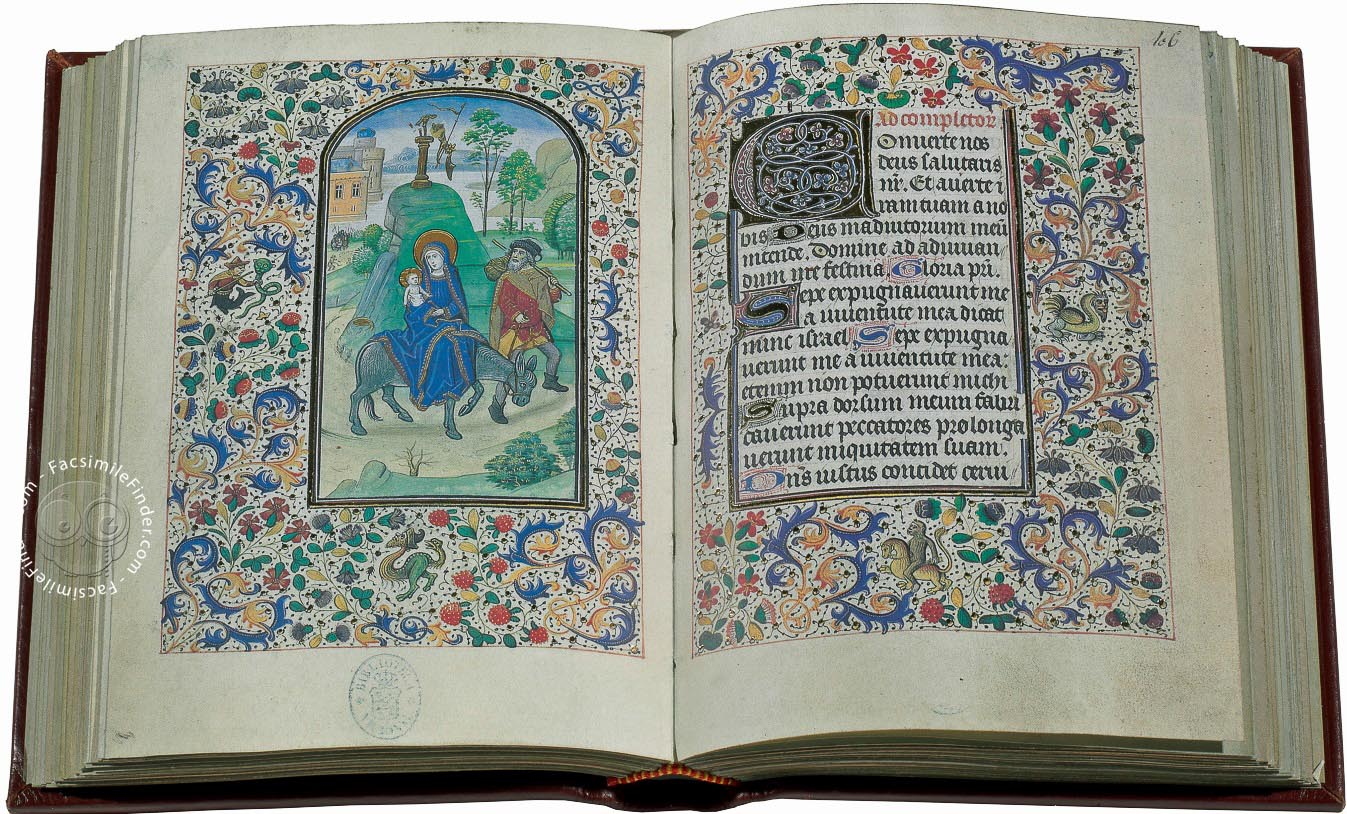

The author, Willem Vrelant of Utrecht, was born in 1410 and died in Bruges in 1481. He was a student of Jan van Eyck, and was active in Flanders, where this book of hours was made, between 1465 and 1470.

The manuscript was sent in 1498 as a gift from the ambassador of Spain in Flanders, Diego Ramirez de Villaescusa, to the Spanish ambassador in Rome, Garcilaso de la Vega, the father of the poet Garcilaso de la Vega. The book of hours was named for the poet's sister, Leonor de la Vega, who inherited the codex from her brother.

== Description ==
The manuscript presents a goatskin binding, and is made on parchment folios (202), 19 x 13 cm in size, for a total of 404 pages. A calendar without artwork contrasts with the many illustrations of the different chapters: the Hours of the Virgin, Hours of the Cross, and Hours of the Holy Spirit, with full-page miniatures and borders full of plants, monsters or satirical scenes, with applied gold leaf on many illustrations and much of the lettering.

== Sources ==
- Durrieu, P. (1893). Manuscrits d'Espagne remarquables par leur peintures et par la beauté de leur exécution. nº 24 (París).
