= Kairosis =

Kairosis is the literary effect of fulfillment in time. This effect is normally associated with the epic/novel genre of literature, and can be understood by the analogy "as catharsis is to the dramatic, so kenosis is to the lyric, so kairosis is to the epic/novel." It is derived from Frank Kermode's usage of kairos in literary aesthetics, and is part of an ongoing debate within literary aesthetics about the limitations of the rhetorical use of the term kairos.

Kairosis is the feeling of integration experienced by the reader of the novel or epic form; it is experienced by the reader as the central protagonist's character and characterisation faces crisis and resolves itself into an explored and integrated personality. This typically occurs by challenging unique and interesting characters with typical and stereotyped actions that are generally applicable to all people.

In the novel Emma, kairosis is developed when an individualistic young woman attempts to play matchmaker to the world. As her personality is challenged by the stereotypical activity of courtship and matchmaking in a young woman's life, she experiences a crisis in her character as contradictions within her personality become increasingly antagonistic. When Emma integrates these conflicts, by performing the stereotyped action of completing a successful match, the reader experiences kairosis as Emma's character reaches a moment of synthesis that embodies the previous dialectical contradictions.

Emma's problem was not to gain a social status of marriage: we are always aware that she will be married by the end of the novel and there is no catharsis experienced as an unexpected climactic action. Rather, we do not know if Emma is worth marrying. This kind of moral-psychological question is at the heart of Austen's work, and the modern novel. Kairosis is experienced by the reader of the modern novel when the character reaches a moment of psychological integration in time.

Kairosis has been used as part of an attempt in role playing game (rpg) theory to grapple with the issue of immersion.

== See also ==
- Compare to the theological and rhetorical concept of Kairos.
