= Hours of Mary of Burgundy =

Devotional illuminated manuscript made in Flanders around 1477

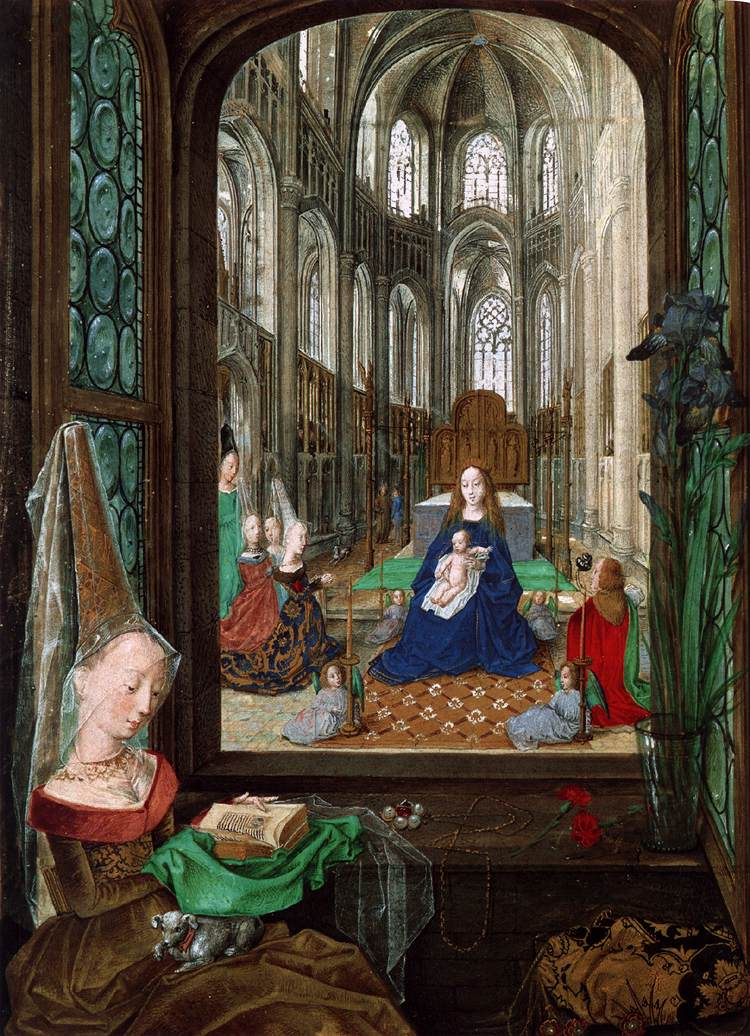
Folio 14v: The Virgin in a church with Mary of Burgundy at her devotions

The Hours of Mary of Burgundy (German: Stundenbuch der Maria von Burgund) is a book of hours, a form of devotional book for lay-people, completed in Flanders around 1477, and now in the National Library of Austria. It was probably commissioned for Mary, the ruler of the Burgundian Netherlands and then the wealthiest woman in Europe. No records survive as to its commission. The book contains 187 folios, each measuring 225 by 150 millimetres (8.9 in × 5.9 in). It consists of the Roman Liturgy of the Hours, 24 calendar roundels, 20 full-page miniatures and 16 quarter-page format illustrations. Its production began c. 1470, and includes miniatures by several artists, of which the foremost was the unidentified but influential illuminator known as the Master of Mary of Burgundy, who provides the book with its most meticulously detailed illustrations and borders. Other miniatures, considered of an older tradition, were contributed by Simon Marmion, Willem Vrelant and Lieven van Lathem. The majority of the calligraphy is attributed to Nicolas Spierinc, with whom the Master collaborated on other works and who may also have provided a number of illustrations.

The two best known illustrations contain a revolutionary trompe-l'œil technique of showing a second perspective through an open window from the main pictorial setting. It is sometimes known as one of the black books of hours, due to the dark and sombre appearance of the first 34 pages, in which the gilded letter was written on black panels. The book has been described as "undoubtedly [...] among the most important works of art made in the late middle ages...a milestone in the history of art and one of the most precious objects of the late middle ages". Given the dark colourisation and mournful tone of the opening folios, the book may originally have been intended to mark the death of Mary's father, Charles the Bold, who died in 1477 at the Battle of Nancy. Midway through its production, it is thought to have been recommissioned as a gift to celebrate Mary's marriage to Maximilian. Tonally, the early pages change from dark, sombre colours to a later sense of optimism and unity.

== Commission ==
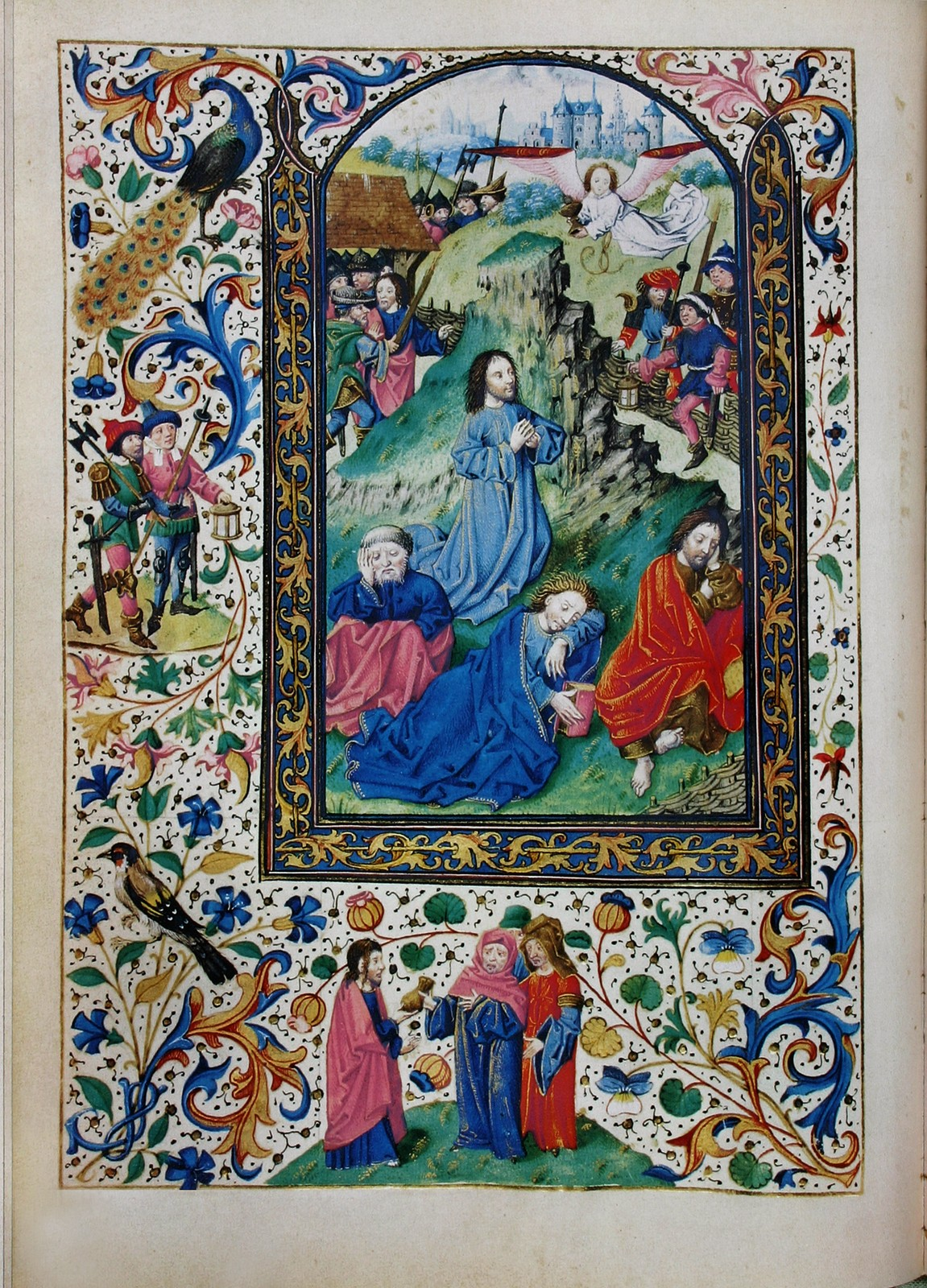
Folio 15v: Christ on the Mount of Olives

The book was for centuries known as the "Vienna Hours of Charles the Bold", and thought to have been intended to mark the death of Charles the Bold, ruler of the Burgundian Netherlands, at the Battle of Nancy on 5 January 1477, and thus as a book of mourning, intended for either his widow, Margaret of York, or his daughter, Mary. (Note: Margaret of York, Mary's stepmother, has been described as "arguably the most interesting and aesthetically discerning bibliophile during Charles's reign", and commissioned a number of other illuminated manuscripts. Kren, 21) As Charles's sole heir, Mary became both the wealthiest woman in Europe and the last of her dynasty. The idea that it was originally a book of mourning is reinforced by the mournful appearance of the opening 34 pages, where the gold and silver lettering is placed on parchment that has been stained black, in a technique associated with the so-called black books of hours. Only seven of these Illuminated manuscripts survive today, all produced in the mid to late 15th century. Given their novel visual appeal, and the use of gold and silver leaf, they were more expensive and highly prized than more conventional books of hours, and produced for high-ranking members of the court of Philip the Good (Note: Philip was an enthusiastic patron of the arts. During his reign and financial support, both panel painting and the production of illuminated manuscripts flourished. Campbell, 20) and Charles the Bold. The Burgundian court had a preference for dark, sombre colourisation and the extant works in this style were mostly commissioned for them. Only the wealthy nobility could have afforded such books, and the taste for mournful colours – often reflected in their dress style – was reflected in the black, gold and silver of these manuscripts.

After page 35, the parchment is predominantly left white and the images are lighter in tone. Given this change, the intention for the book may have changed from mourning to celebration: that is, its purpose changed from being a commemoration of Charles's death to a token of honour for Mary's marriage to Maximilian of Austria. This is indicated by the items on the window sill next to her in the Virgin in the Church illustration. Traditionally, pearls represent purity, and a transparent veil signifies virtue, while red carnations were often used as symbols of love. Evidence that it was commissioned for Mary include the feminine gender endings in some of the prayers and the recurring pairs of gold armorial shields throughout the book, indicating that it was prepared for an upcoming marriage. Art historian Antoine De Schryver argues that this change of purpose and the pressure of completion for the wedding date of August 1477 explains why so many individual artists were involved.

== Attribution ==
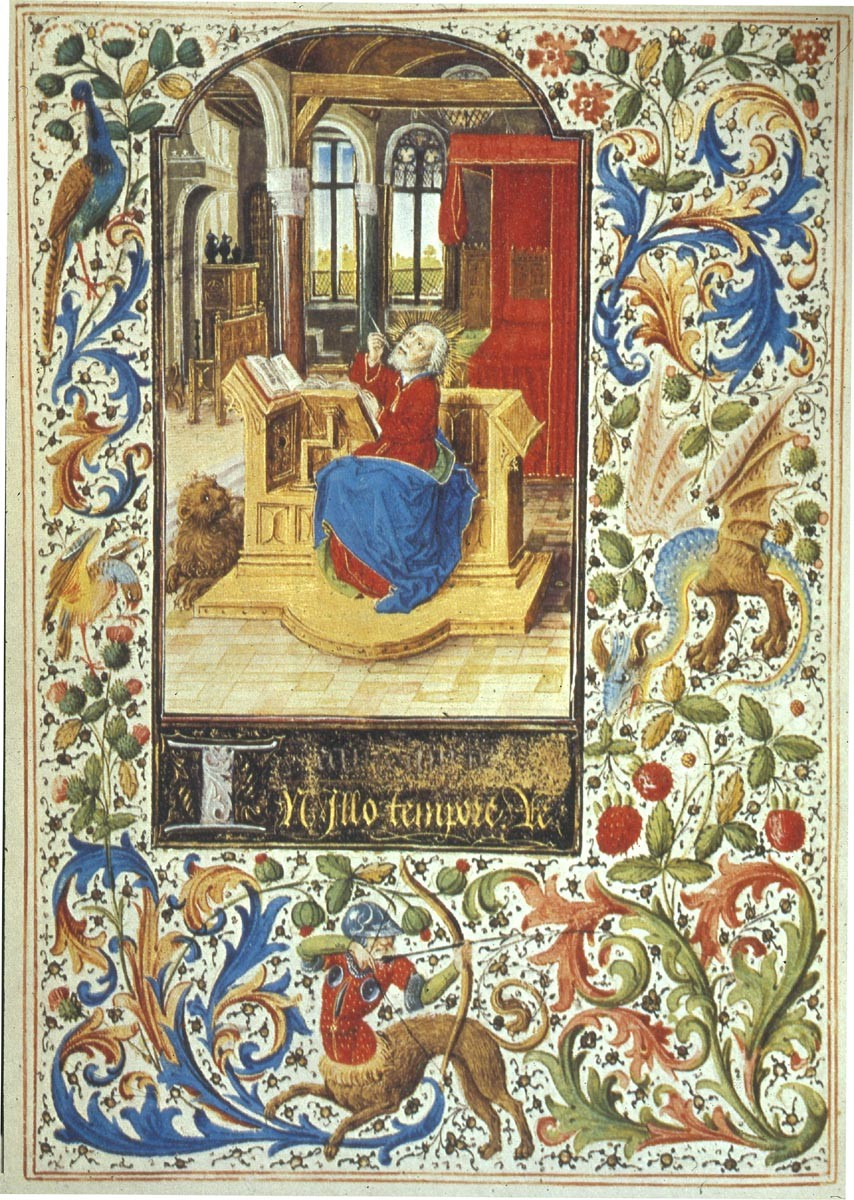
Folio 33r: Mark the Evangelist

Work on the book is thought to have begun c. 1470. The Flemish artist Nicolas Spierinc, a favourite of the Burgundian court and Charles in particular, has been identified as the chief scribe of the elegant and complex calligraphy. There is speculation that the artist was active in Bruges at the end of the 15th century. He may have directed assistants to carry out some of the lettering, excepting key passages. An anagram of his name appears on the borders of the miniature on folio 94v, The Way to Calvary.

The miniatures were completed by a team of at least nine artists and illustrators, including Simon Marmion, attributed a single illustration, Willem Vrelant and Lieven van Lathem. Van Lathem is attributed with the "Christ before Pilate" miniature, which seems influenced by Hand K of the Turin-Milan Hours (c. 1420). Most attention is given to the innovative images attributed to the Master of Mary of Burgundy, known to have been active in Flanders between 1469 and 1483, and who was greatly influenced by the innovations of contemporary northern European panel painting, particularly the melancholy of Hugo van der Goes (Note: Early identifications of the Master suggested he was a brother of van der Goes. Kren & McKendrick, 153) and the illusionism of Jan van Eyck. The Master is thought to have been the primary illuminator responsible for a second book commissioned by the family, the Prayer Book of Charles the Bold, now in Berlin. (Note: The Berlin Book of hours is a further collaboration between the Master, van Lathem and Marmion. Kren & McKendrick, 137)

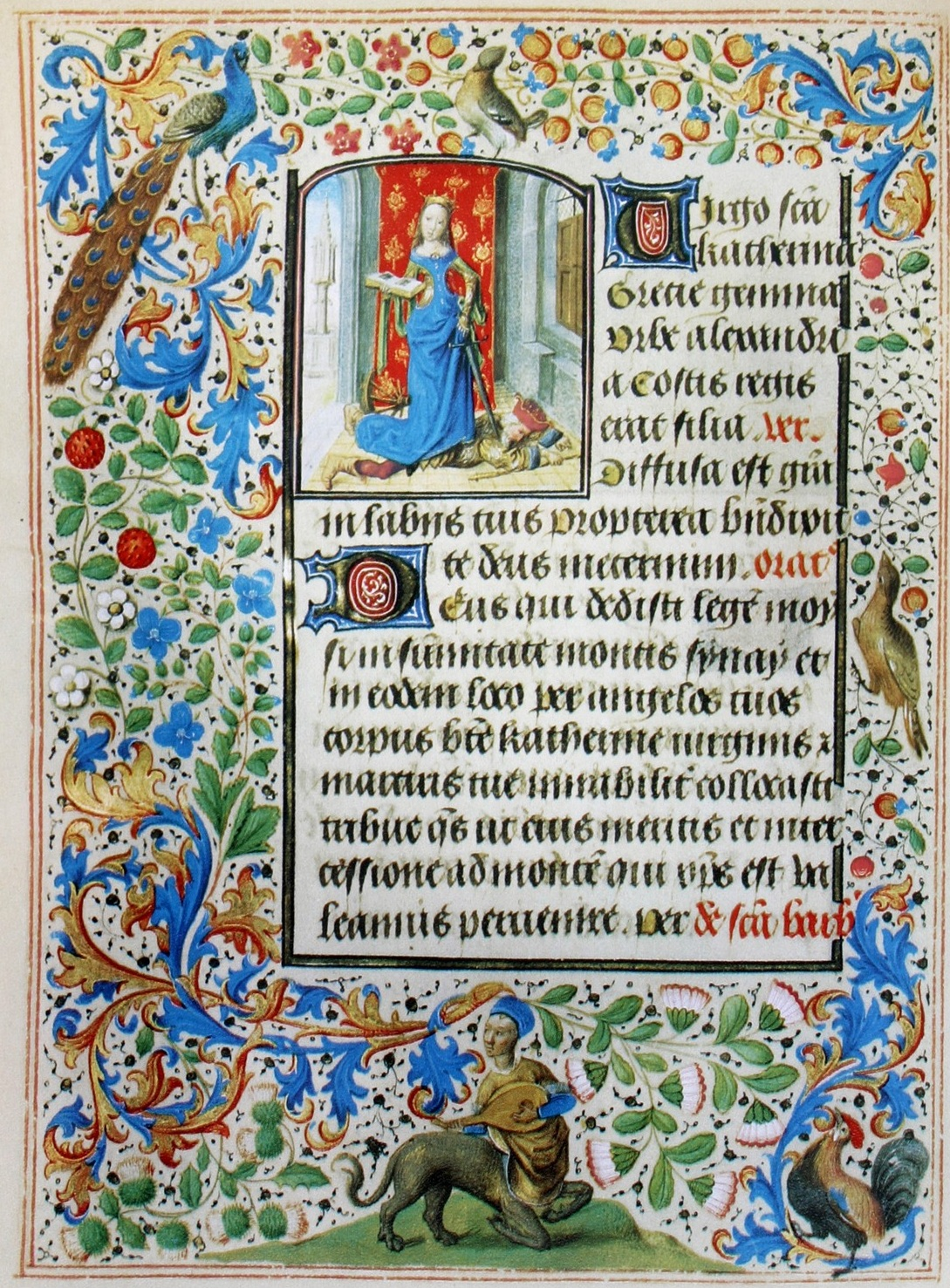
Saint Catherine

A majority have been specifically attributed to one of these artists, though there is some debate over a number. The illustrations can be characterised by the use of everyday devotional objects, including books, rosary beads and contemporary everyday settings, to frame images of divine saints and thereby bringing the sacred into domestic, earthly spaces.

== Design ==
The book consists of 186 original folios of 22.5 × 16.3 cm and three folios that were later additions, which measure 21.2 × 15.2 cm. In total there are 20 full-page miniatures, 14 smaller miniatures, 24 calendar sheets, 14 historiated initials and 78 ornamental borders. The text is preoccupied with the litany, and intercessory prayers. The margins on almost every page are decorated with drollerie consisting of flowers, insects, jewels and sibyls, some of which were designed by Lieven van Lathem. Those most praised by art historians were created by the Master of Mary of Burgundy. The marginalia and drolleries are painted in such a way as to suggest that objects are sprinkled over the foil in a three-dimensional manner that suggest, according to art historian Otto Pächt, that they seem not so much "in the imaginary space of the picture, but in that of the real world".

== Miniatures ==
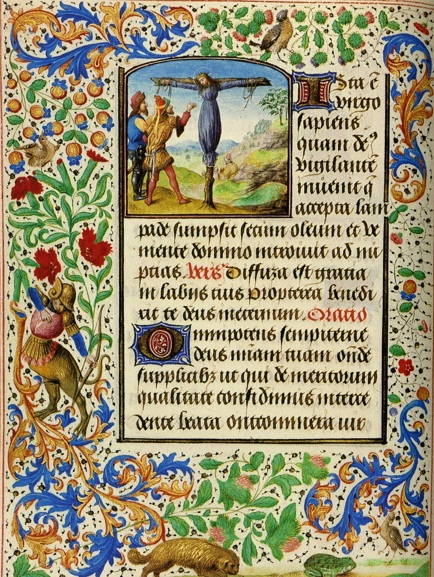
Saint Wilgefortis

The book contains 20 full-page miniatures and 16 small format illustrations. They are all of the highest quality and can be mostly attributed to individual artists or hands. There are noticeable changes in standards and style between the miniatures attributed to the Master of Mary of Burgundy and those attributed to other hands. There is some commonality between the images; the idealised facial types are similar, and thin cumulus clouds appear throughout.

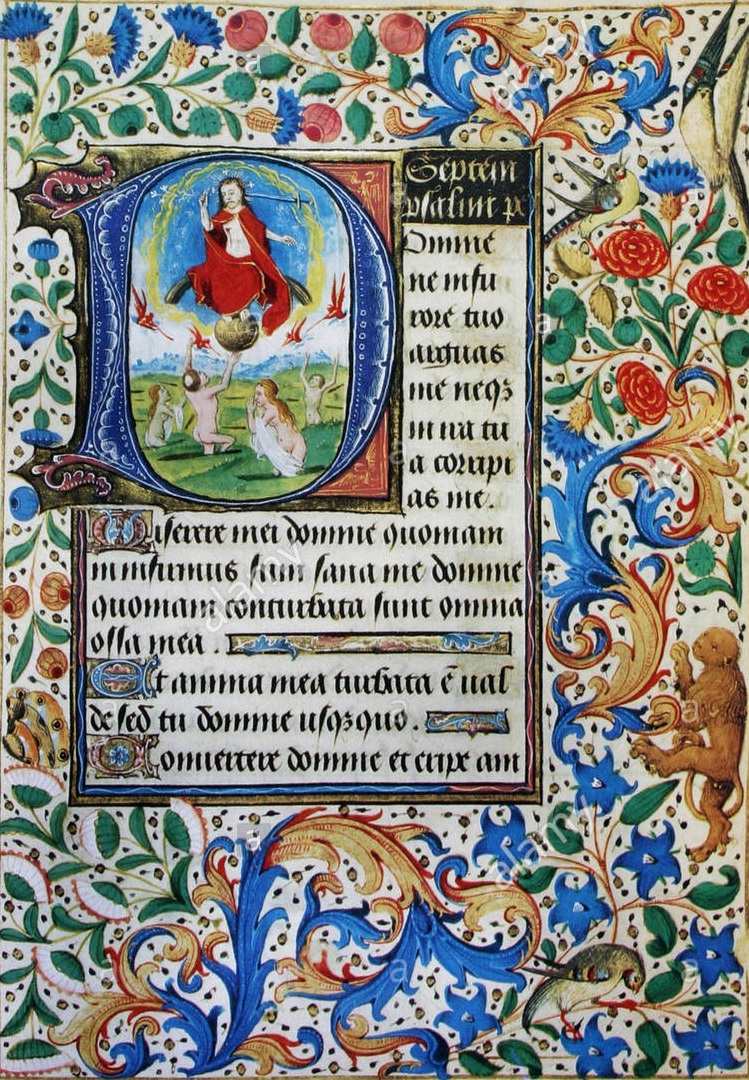
Last Judgement

The Master's work is characterised by mixed colours that whiten toward the horizon, while in others they are saturated. He achieved the modelling of figures and objects by building layers of paint in thin but visible brush strokes, rather than hatching. His palette is noticeably darker than that of the other hands, mostly consisting of purples, browns and greys, with the areas around the figure's faces and hands coloured with black pigment. The art historian Thomas Kren says his miniatures in this book "constitute an art of profound emotion; subtle atmospheric effects; abundant, richly textured detail; and the most delicate draftsmanship. His miniatures convey a powerful sense of the moment".

The book's best-known miniatures, the Virgin and Child, Christ nailed to the Cross, and the Crucifixion, are attributed to the Master. Folio 14v shows the Virgin Mary in a Gothic church seen through the window of a room containing Mary of Burgundy at her devotions, reading from an open book, with the Virgin appearing as if the embodiment of Mary's prayers. In Folio 43v, Christ lies on his cross, in an expansive view of Calvary, seemingly viewed through a window. In both, the background scene becomes the main focus, with the foreground image merely providing the setting for the 'main stage'. It is because of these two miniatures that the Master is seen as the main innovator in bringing about a new style of Flemish illumination in the 1470s and 1480s, earning him a great number of imitators. The colourisation is often extremely subtle, with some illustrations containing upwards of eighteen different shades.

=== Virgin and Child ===
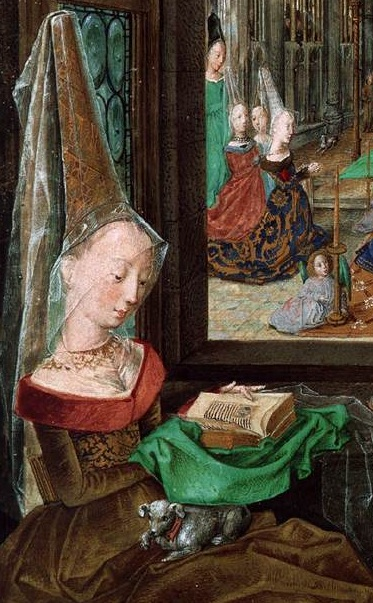
Detail, folio 14v: Mary of Burgundy at Prayer. Mary appears in both the foreground and background, with the virgin appearing as if an "audience to her prayer".

Mary of Burgundy can be identified as the woman in the foreground of folio 14v from the facial similarity to documented contemporary drawings and paintings. She is shown as an elegant young princess, reading a book of hours. Her finger traces the text of what seem to be the words Obsecro te Domina sancta maria ("I Beseech Thee, Holy Mary"), a popular prayer of indulgence in contemporary manuscript illuminations of donors venerating the Virgin and Child. Mary is positioned in an intimate and private domestic setting, probably a private chapel or oratory, reading a book of hours draped in a green cloth. A small white dog, a symbol of faithfulness, rests on her lap. She wears a gold or brown velvet dress, and a long hennin, from which hangs a transparent veil. The window before her is opened through two timber boards adorned with glass. Its ledge contains a veil, rosary beads, a gold chain with ruby and four pearls, two red carnations as symbols of betrothal, and a crystal vase containing a large flowering iris, a late medieval symbol of purity.

The Virgin and Child are visible through the open window as an "image within an image", as if as an apparition or the literal embodiment of the book she is reading. Thus Mary of Burgundy is placed in physical proximity to the Virgin, without the usual intercession of the saint. The holy family are seated in a Gothic church with a high vaulted ambulatory, before the high altar, in front of which is a lattice-patterned decorative carpet. Four angels sit at the corners of the carpet, each holding a gold candlestick marking the sacred space. Three court ladies, one looking outwards, are positioned to the left, kneeling with their hands clasped in prayer. One, probably Mary of Burgundy, wears a blue brocade and gown and holds a small book in her hands. The other two ladies seem to be her attendants. A male figure kneeling to the right is dressed in red and swings a censer of burning incense, while two other figures are positioned behind the high altar.

The use of an open window was influenced by van Eyck's c. 1435 oil-on-panel painting the Madonna of Chancellor Rolin, where the pictorial space is divided into two areas; a foreground chiaroscuro interior which leads out, through arcades, to an expansive bright-lit exterior landscape. In the Vienna miniature, the artist achieves the transition from foreground to background by slowly diminishing the figures' scale and plasticity. The illustration has been compared in breadth of detail and style to van Eyck's Madonna in the Church, a small panel painting, which is yet twice the size of the Master's illumination.

=== Christ nailed to the Cross ===
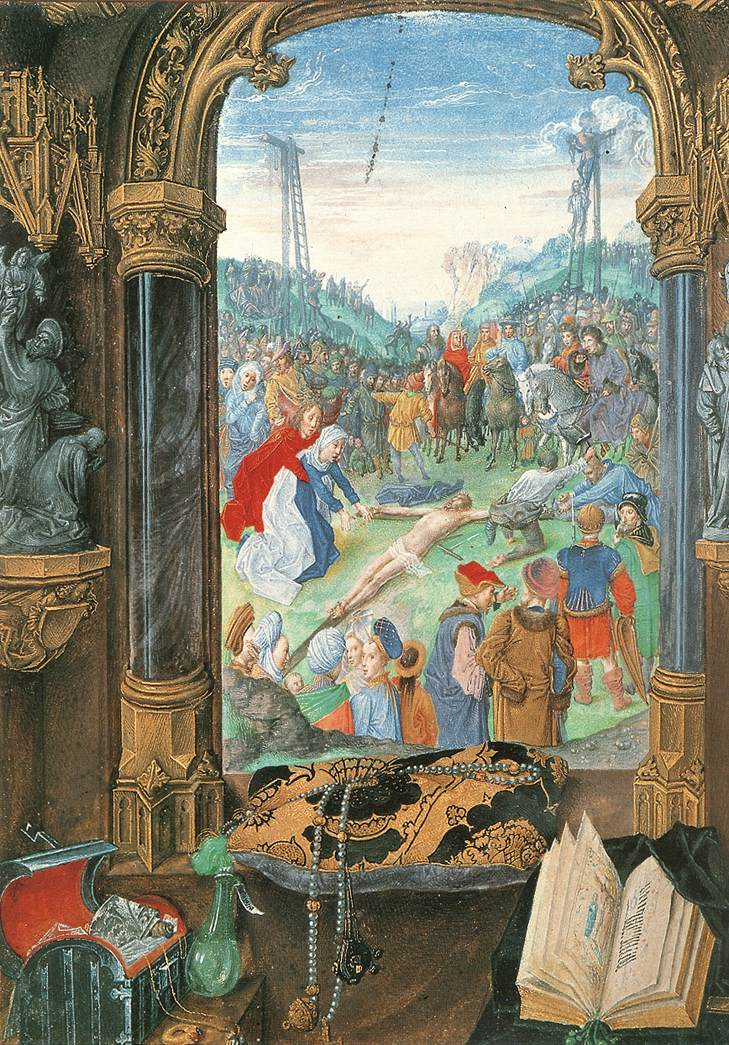
Folio 43v: Christ nailed to the Cross, attributed to the Master of Mary of Burgundy

Folio 43v, Christ nailed to the Cross, shows a biblical scene viewed through the elaborately carved stone window of a contemporary late 15th century setting. The foreground interior scene is empty of people, but can again be assumed to be an oratory, and contains an array of attributes and objects of devotion, including a prayer book with black chemise binding, prayer beads, (Note: The prayer beads are similar to those owned by Mary's daughter Margaret of Austria, which we know from a portrait now in New York. It may be that they are the same beads, passed from mother to daughter. Nash, 275) a brocade cushion and a number of jewels. The background composition consists of a complex exploration of perspective. The artist employs a central axis and vanishing point to create an aerial perspective of sophistication previously unseen in northern illumination. As art historian Susie Nash notes, "Mary [of Burgundy], looking at her prayer book, would see on this page a depiction of the accoutrements of prayer she might also be currently be using in reality, set around the real prayer book in which they are depicted".

The viewer is thus positioned, as if from the point of view of the reader of the book itself, outside of the main pictorial setting. The scene beyond the window contains a cast of characters numbering in the many hundreds, before an expansive landscape and threatening and gloomy sky. The vast panorama is achieved by the illuminator's skill in achieving depth, recession and scale. But the figure's distance from the viewer means that they are rendered in a rather vague and summary style. The figure of Christ seems modeled on a similar painting of the Crucifixion attributed to Gerard David, now in the National Gallery, London. The women, particularly at the front, wear a variety of exotic and extravagant headgear, of types also seen in the Virgin and Child, in folio 152v The Presentation in the Temple, from his Book of Hours of Engelbert of Nassau, and in attributed miniatures from the "Trivulzio Hours".

In the scene, two crosses have already been erected, on top of two small mounds. But there is no third, larger mound, which should be positioned between those of the thieves and bearing Christ's cross. Because of this anomaly, Nash believes the viewer's perspective is deliberately misleading; the viewer is not looking out towards Golgotha, but is on Golgotha. Nash suggests that this explains why a praying figure is absent from the room before the window – Mary is participating in the actual event. She further notes that Mary Magdalene, usually closely associated with the crucifixion, is also missing, and speculates that Mary be playing the role normally associated with the Magdalene.

The margins of the page are decorated with imaginative and somewhat whimsical flowers, insects and a jewel. The influence of van der Goes can be seen in the modelling of St John, who closely resembles the same figure in the earlier artist's The Fall of Man and The Lamentation of 1470–75.

=== Crucifixion ===
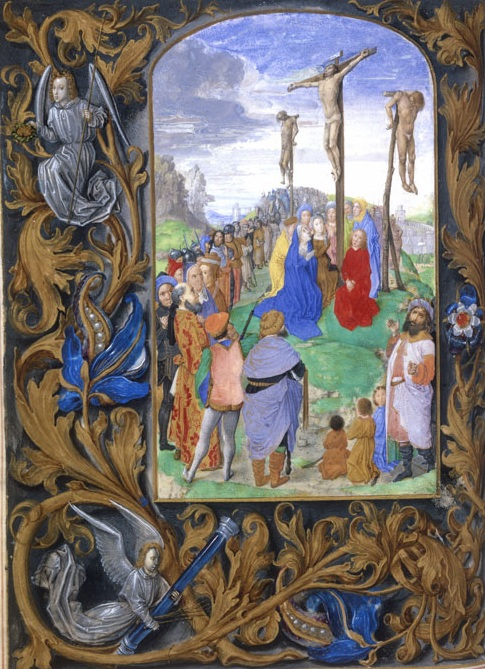
Folio 99v: Crucifixion, attributed to the Master of Mary of Burgundy

The Crucifixion miniature, folio 99v, shows Christ and the two thieves raised on their crosses over a vast crowd which forms around them in a circular shape. Christ's body is twisted in pain, and painted with particular detail and skill. His chest rises heavily as he gasps for breath, while his body is rendered in delicate proportion.

The Virgin Mary, dressed in blue, and Mary Magdalene, dressed in red, kneel at the foot of his cross. According to Kren, the image achieves its immediacy through the "numerous figures in motion — writhing, gesturing, stepping, or just listening with head attentively inclined". As with the other miniatures attributed to the Master, a number of the figures look outwards, as if towards the viewer. The work shows a number of similarities to a Deposition in the J. Paul Getty Museum, also thought to be by the Master's hand.

== Provenance ==
Matthias, Holy Roman Emperor, acquired the book around 1580; he spent much of the period 1578–81 in the Netherlands. It disappeared after his death in 1619. It is thought to have been acquired by the Austrian National Library in Vienna c. 1721–27. The library was looted by Napoleon's troops in 1809, and the book was taken to Paris. It was returned to Vienna in 1815, following Napoleon's defeat at the Battle of Waterloo. It remains in the Austrian National Library, where it is classified as Codex Vindobonensis 1857.
