= Engelbert II of Nassau =

Count of Nassau-Vianden and Lord of Breda

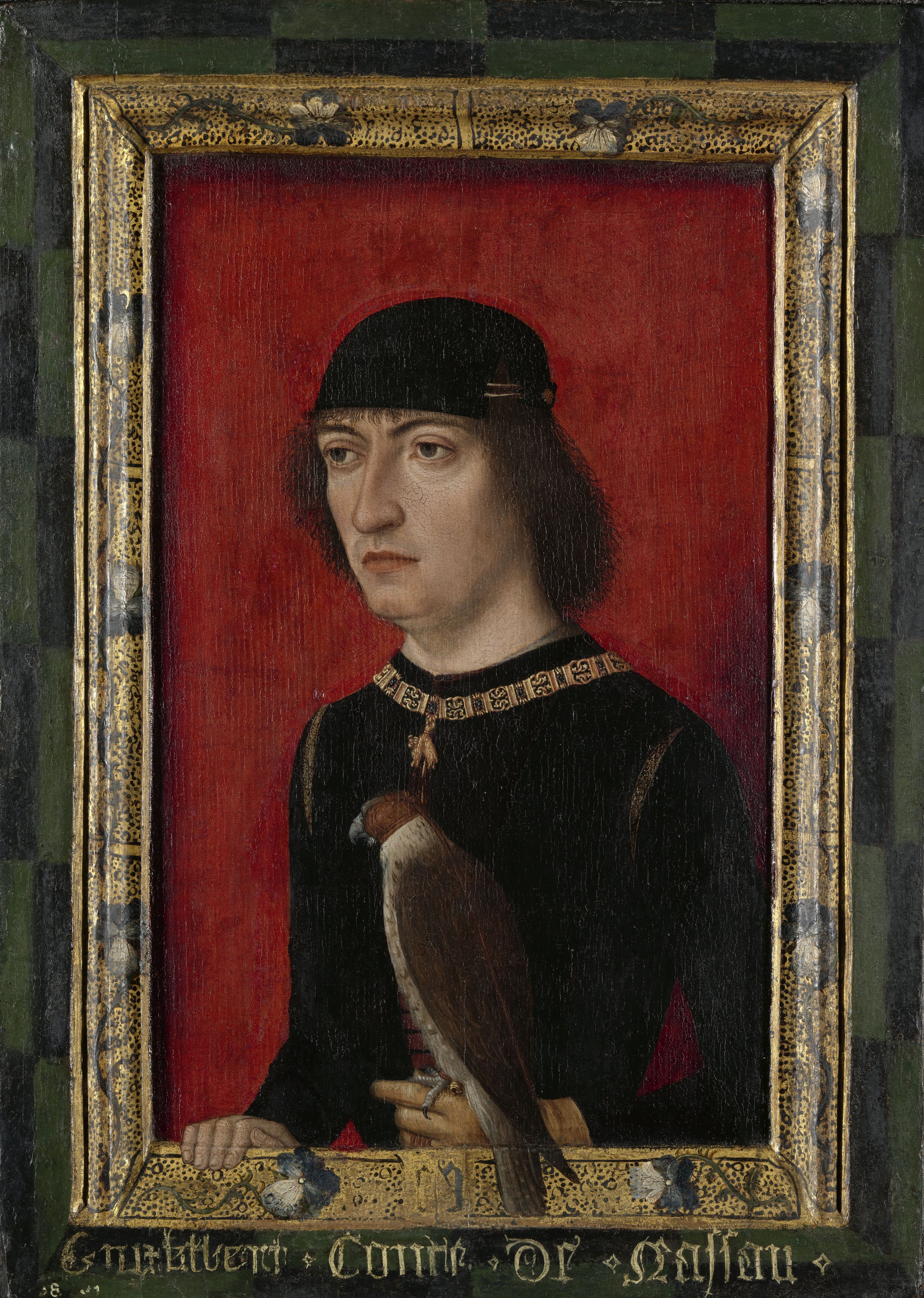
- Portrait of Engelbrecht II of Nassau in the Rijksmuseum Amsterdam

Count of Nassau-Siegen Count of Vianden Lord of Breda
- Reign: 1475–1504
- Predecessor: John IV
- Successor: Henry III of Nassau-Breda
- Born: 17 May 1451; Breda
- Died: 31 May 1504 (aged 53); Brussels
- Buried: Grote kerk in Breda
- Noble family: Nassau-Siegen
- Spouse: Cimburga van Baden
- Father: John IV, Count of Nassau-Siegen
- Mother: Mary of Looz-Heinsberg

Engelbert II of Nassau, Engelbrecht in Dutch (17 May 1451 – 31 May 1504), was count of Nassau and Vianden and lord of Breda, Lek, Diest, Roosendaal, Nispen and Wouw. He was a soldier and courtier, for some time leader of the Privy council of the Duchy of Burgundy and a significant patron of the arts.

== Biography ==
Engelbert was born in Breda on 17 May 1451, the son of John IV of Nassau-Siegen and his wife Mary of Looz-Heinsberg.

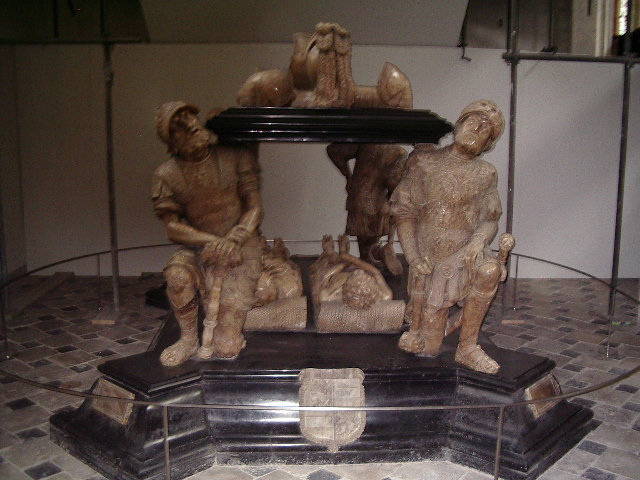
The grave of Engelbert II at the Grote Kerk in Breda, Netherlands.

On 19 December 1468 in Koblenz he married Cimburga van Baden, daughter of Charles I, Margrave of Baden-Baden.

Engelbert was lord of Breda between 1475 and 1504. In 1472 he concluded a treaty with his brother John V of Nassau-Siegen in which he received the possessions West of the Rhine. Charles the Bold made him a knight in the Order of the Golden Fleece, at the age of 22, in 1473.

After the death of Charles the Bold, Engelbert entered in the service of Maximilian I, Holy Roman Emperor, who had married Charles's daughter Mary of Burgundy.

In 1479, he commanded troops during the Battle of Guinegate and during the suppression of a rebellion at Bruges.

In 1487, he was captured by the French during the Battle of Béthune, and released for an "enormous" ransom 2 years later. In 1496 he was appointed stadtholder of Flanders and by 1498 he had been named President of the Grand Conseil.

In 1501, Maximilian named him Lieutenant-General of the Low Countries. From that point forward (until his death in 1504) Engelbert was the principal representative of the Habsburg Empire to the region.

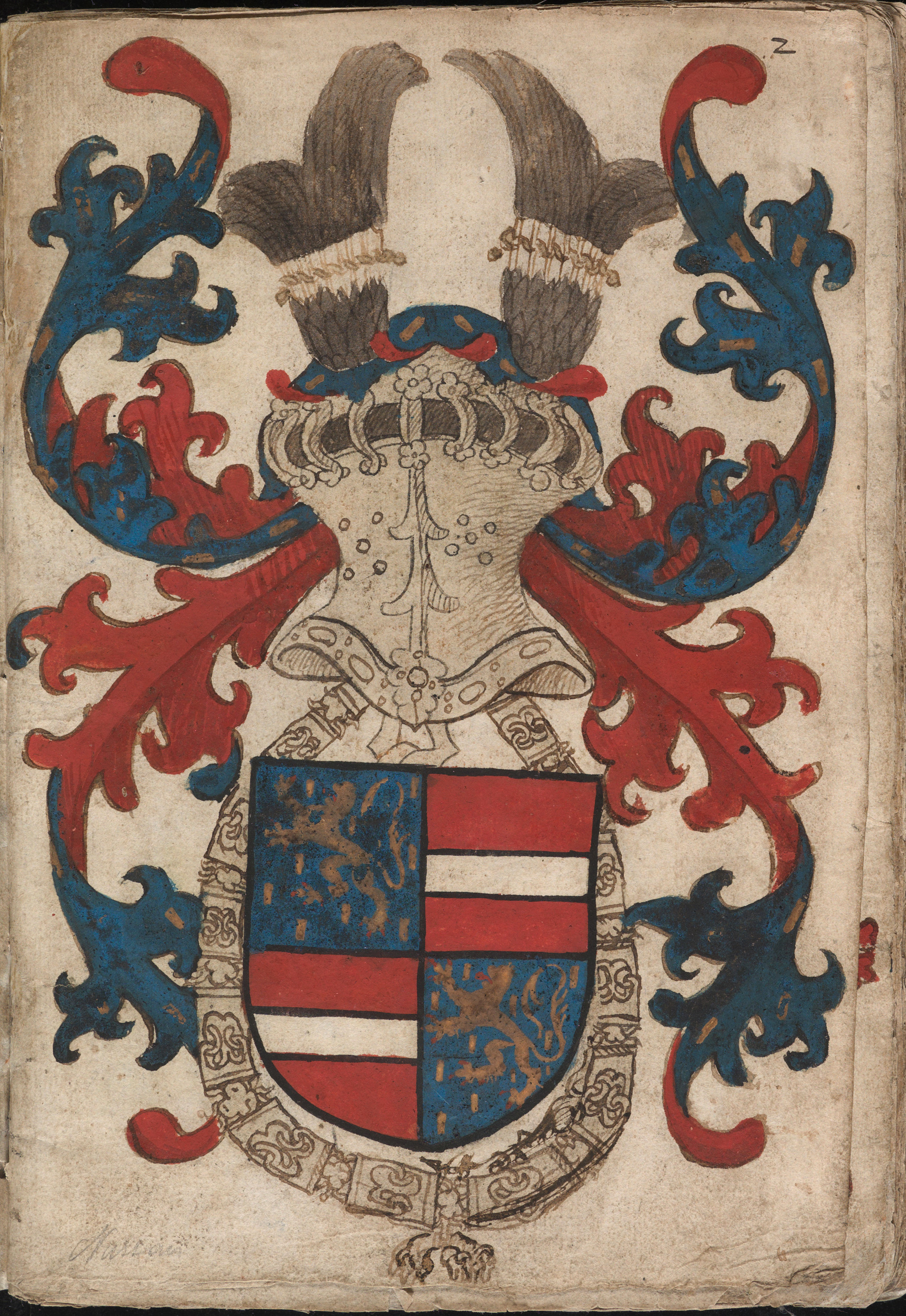
Coat of arms of Engelbert II of Nassau from the Nassau-Vianden armorial (ca. 1490)

== Death ==
Engelbert died on 31 May 1504 in Brussels and is buried in the Grote kerk in Breda. He had no legitimate children and appointed his nephew Henry III of Nassau-Breda as his successor. Engelbert had two illegitimate children: Engelbrecht and Barbara.

== Engelbert II of Nassau in art ==
Engelbert's portrait by the Master of the Portraits of Princes, can be found in the Rijksmuseum Amsterdam. He was one of the last important patrons of Flemish illuminated manuscripts, and commissioned perhaps the most sumptuous manuscript of the Roman de la Rose, British Library Harley MS 4425, which has 92 large and high quality miniatures, despite a date around 1500; the text was copied by hand from a printed edition. These are by the artist known as the Master of the Prayer Books of around 1500. The Book of Hours of Engelbert of Nassau (Bodleian Library, Oxford, MS. Douce 219–220), of the 1470s or 1480s is another well-known manuscript. It has been suggested that he commissioned The Garden of Earthly Delights by Hieronymous Bosch.

Engelbert II of Nassau House of Nassau Born: 17 May 1451 Died: 31 May 1504
Regnal titles
New title	Governor of the Habsburg Netherlands; 1485–1486	Vacant Direct rule of Maximilian I Title next held by Albert III of Saxony
Vacant Direct rule of Philip the Handsome	Governor of the Habsburg Netherlands; 1501–1504	Succeeded by William de Croÿ
