= Nicolas Spierinc =

15th-century Flemish illuminator and scribe

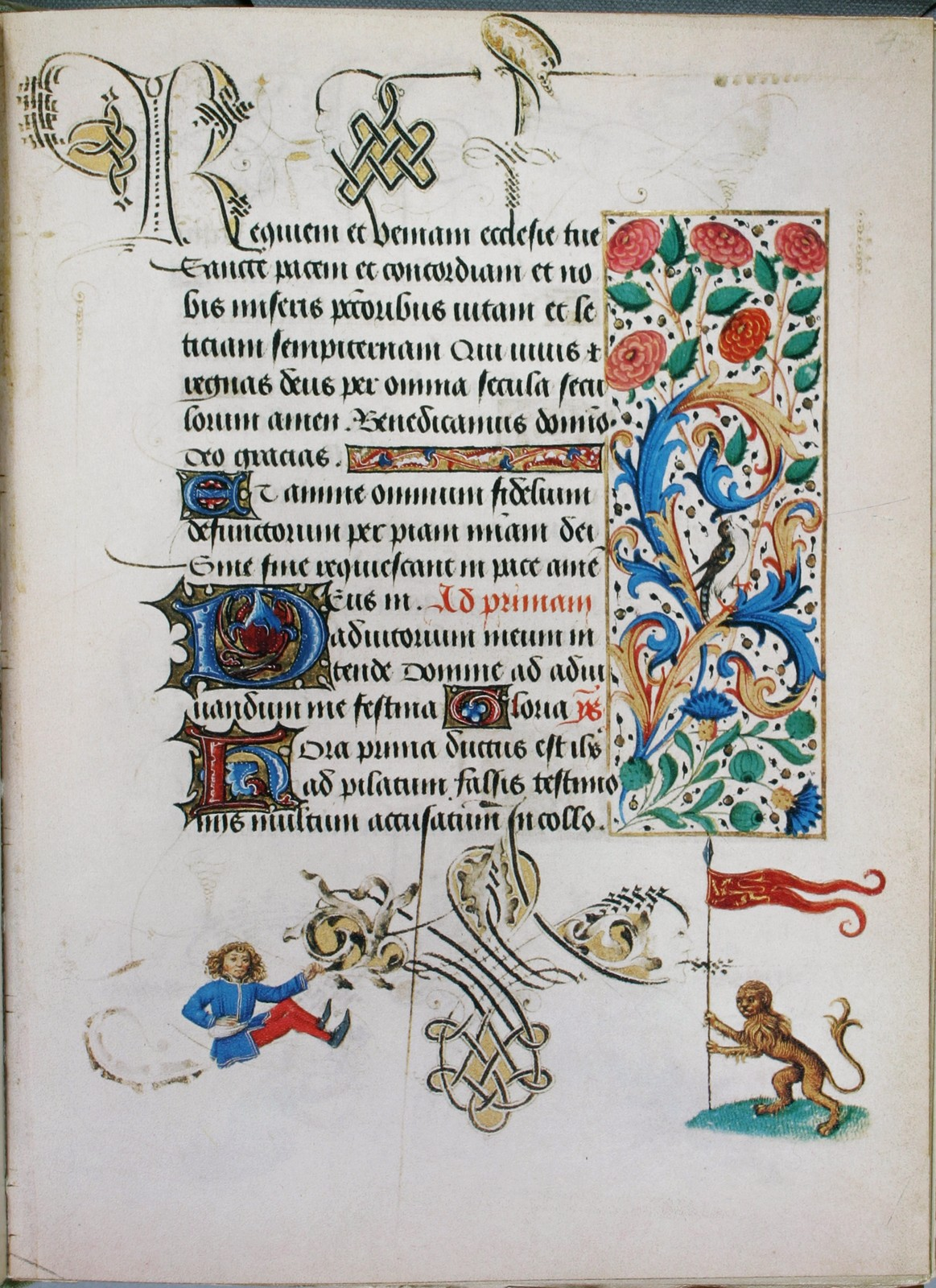
Folio from the Hours of Mary of Burgundy

Nicolas Spierinc was a Flemish illuminator and scribe active in late 1400s. Works attributed to him include the lettering of the Hours of Mary of Burgundy. He was a student of medicine at the University at Louvain, later changing his profession to a scribe and illuminator, moving to Ghent, where he found success and wealth. He is known to have collaborated with both Lieven van Lathem and the Master of Mary of Burgundy on prayer books of hours.

== Sources ==
- de Schryver, Antoine. The Prayer Book of Charles the Bold. Los Angeles: Getty Publications, 2008. ISBN 978-0-8923-6943-0
- Kren, Thomas. Illuminated Manuscripts from Belgium and the Netherlands in the J. Paul Getty Museum. Los Angeles: Getty Publications, 2010. ISBN 978-1-6060-6014-8
