= Book of Hours of Engelbert of Nassau =

Illuminated manuscript

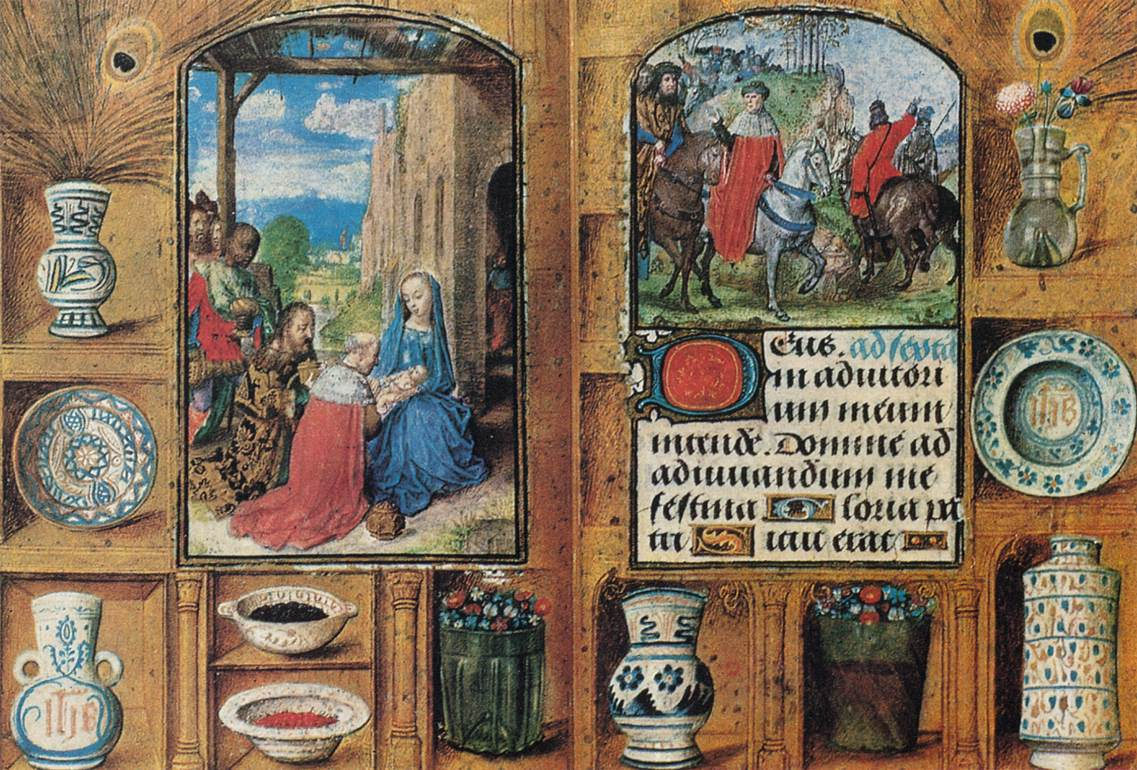
A page from the Hours of Engelbert of Nassau

The Book of Hours of Engelbert of Nassau (Bodleian Library, Oxford, MSS. Douce 219–220) is a book of hours in the Dominican Rite, illuminated by the Master of Mary of Burgundy, which was produced in Ghent in the 1470s or 1480s for Engelbert II of Nassau. It is regarded as one of the high-points of Flemish manuscript illumination.

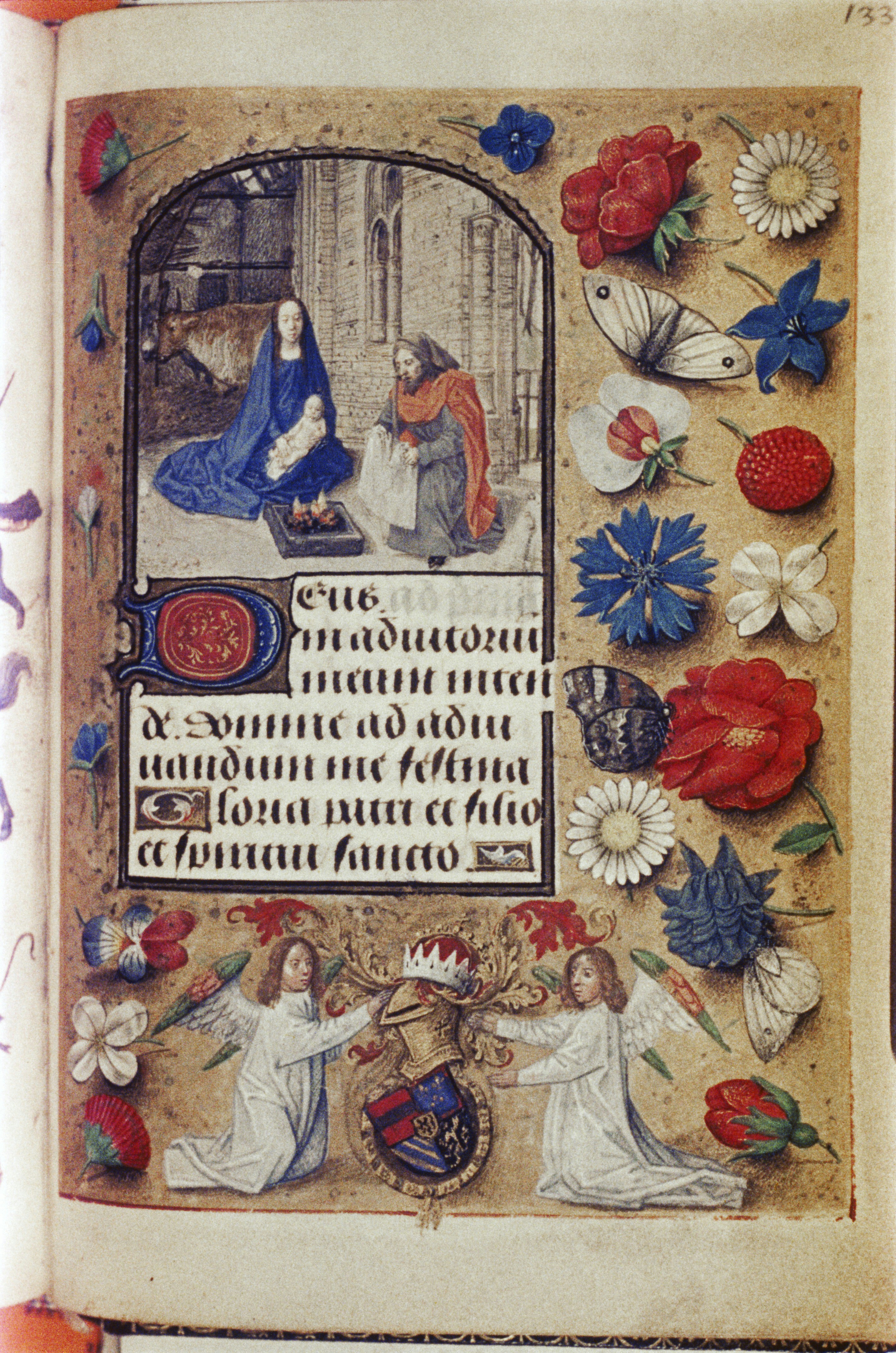
A page from the Hours of Engelbert of Nassau
