= Kairos =

Right or opportune moment

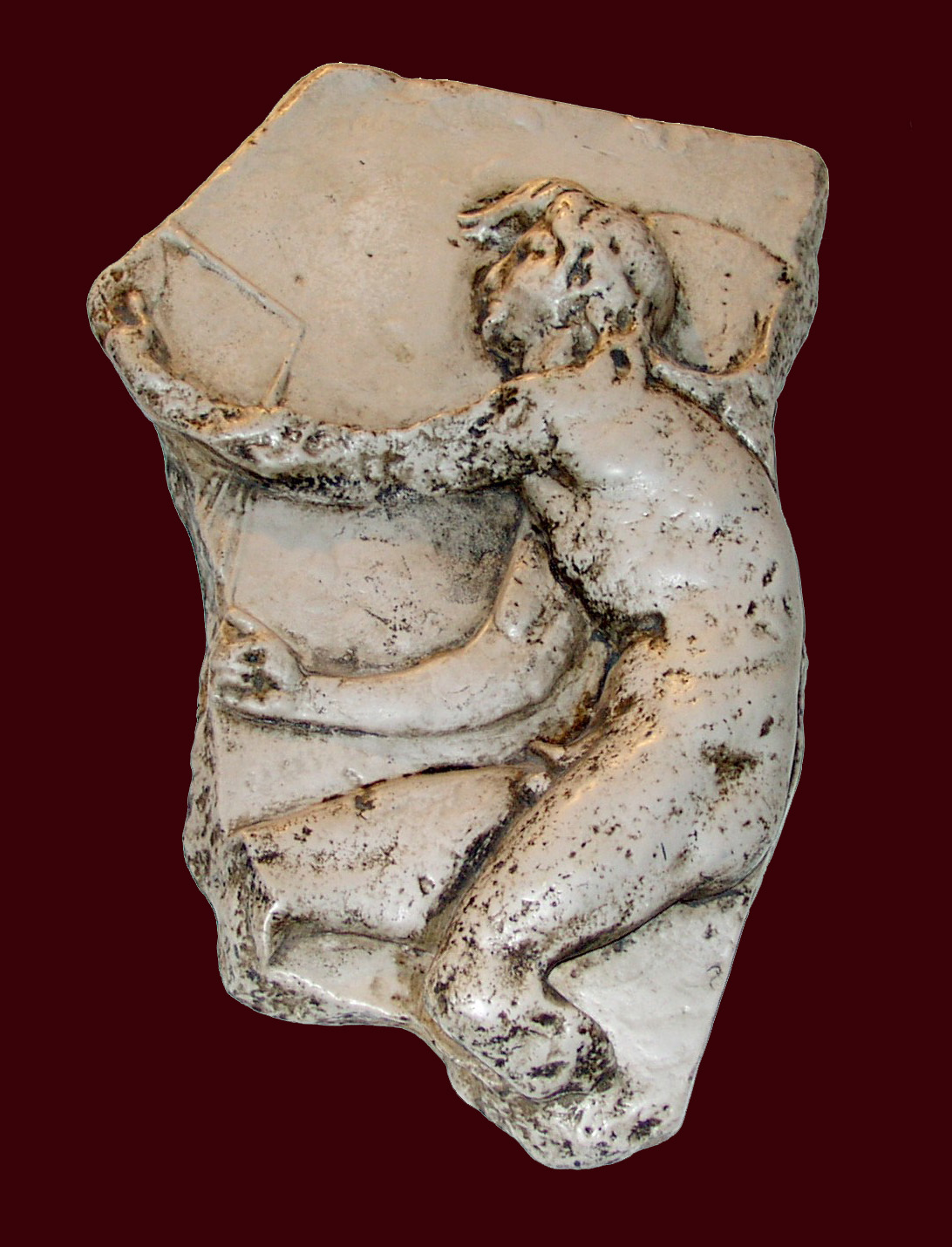
Kairos relief, copy of Lysippos, in Trogir (Croatia)

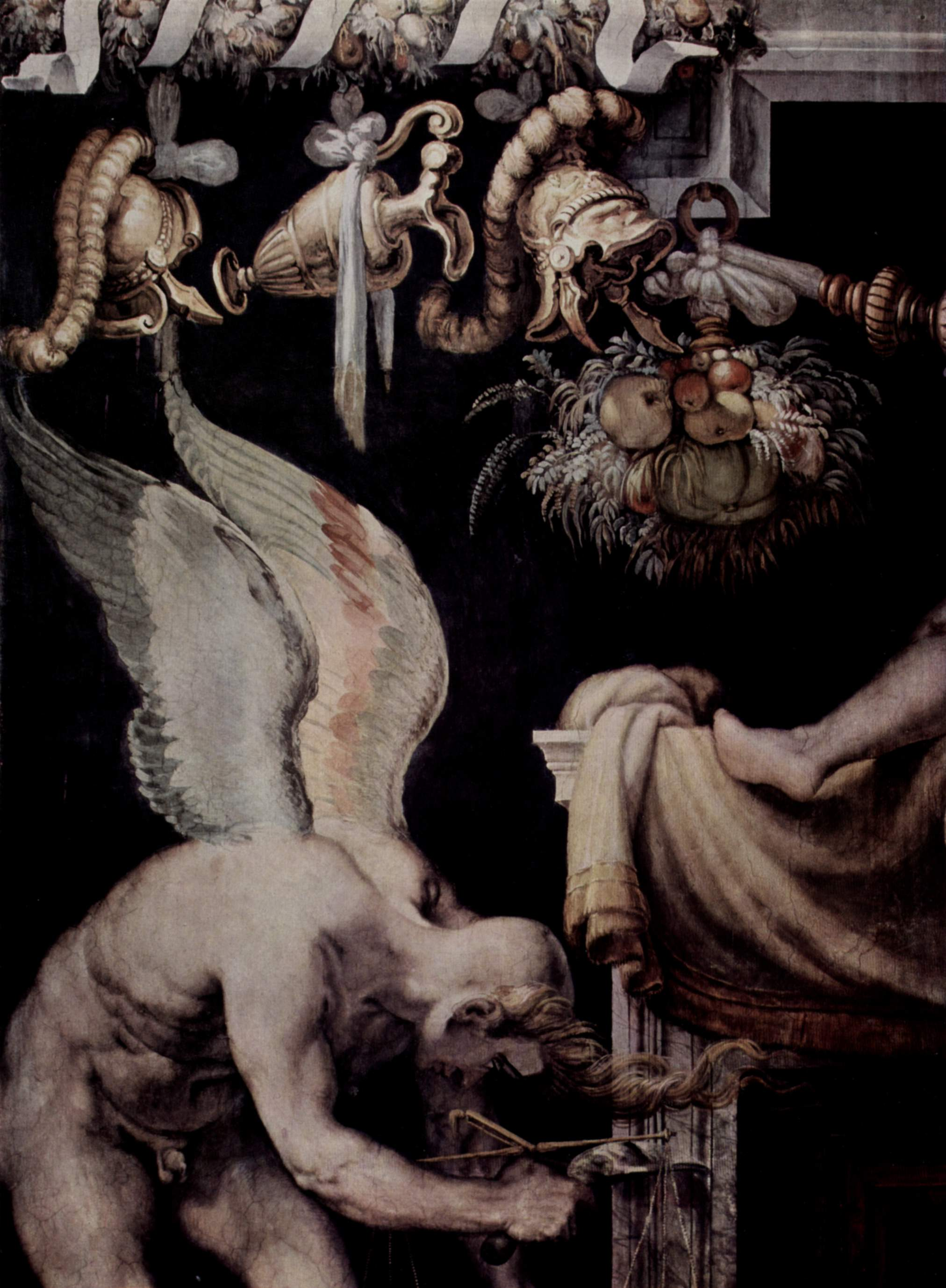
Kairos as portrayed in a 16th-century fresco by Francesco Salviati

Kairos (Ancient Greek: καιρός) is an ancient Greek word meaning 'the exact or critical time'. In modern Greek, kairos also means 'weather' or 'time'. It is one of two words that the ancient Greeks had for 'time'; the other being chronos (χρόνος). Whereas the latter refers to chronological or sequential time, kairos signifies an auspicious time for action. In this sense, while chronos is quantitative, kairos has a qualitative, permanent nature.

The plural, kairoi (καιροί) means 'the times'. Kairos is a term, idea, and practice that has been applied in several fields including classical rhetoric, modern rhetoric, digital media, Christian theology, and science.

== Origins ==
In his 1951 etymological studies of the word, Onians traces the primary root back to ancient Greek associations with both archery and weaving. In archery, kairos denotes the moment in which an arrow may be shot with sufficient force to penetrate a target. In weaving, kairos denotes the moment in which the shuttle could be passed through threads on the loom. Similarly, in his Kaironomia (1983), E.C. White defines kairos as the "long, tunnel-like aperture through which the archer's arrow has to pass", and as the moment "when the weaver must draw the yarn through a gap that momentarily opens in the warp of the cloth being woven". Both are examples of the precise timing of a decision/action to achieve the best outcome.

In the literature of the classical ancient world, writers and orators used kairos to specify moments of opportune action, often through metaphors involving archery and one's ability to aim and shoot at the exact right time on-target. The ancient Greeks formulated kairos in general as a tool to explain and understand the interposition of humans for their actions and the due consequences.

Kairos is also an alternate spelling of the name of the minor Greek deity Caerus, the god of luck and opportunity.

== In classical rhetoric ==
In rhetoric, kairos is "a passing instant when an opening appears which must be driven through with force if success is to be achieved." Kairos, then, means that one must find the best situation, taking timing into consideration, to act.

Kairos was central to the Sophists, who stressed the rhetor's ability to adapt to and take advantage of changing and contingent circumstances. In Panathenaicus, Isocrates writes that educated people are those "who manage well the circumstances which they encounter day by day, and who possess a judgment which is accurate in meeting occasions as they arise and rarely misses the expedient course of action."

Kairos is also very important in Aristotle's scheme of rhetoric. Kairos is, for Aristotle, the time and space context in which the proof will be delivered. Kairos stands alongside other contextual elements of rhetoric: The Audience, which is the psychological and emotional makeup of those who will receive the proof; and To Prepon, which is the style with which the orator clothes the proof.

In Ancient Greece, kairos was utilized by the two main schools of thought in the field of rhetoric, focusing specifically on how kairos applies to speeches. The competing schools were those of the Sophists and their opposition, led by philosophers such as Aristotle and Plato. Sophism approached rhetoric as an art form. Members of the school would travel around Greece teaching citizens about the art of rhetoric and successful discourse. In his article "Toward a Sophistic Definition of Rhetoric", John Poulakos defines rhetoric from a Sophistic perspective as follows: "Rhetoric is the art which seeks to capture in opportune moments that which is appropriate and attempts to suggest that which is possible." Aristotle and Plato, on the other hand, viewed Sophistic rhetoric as a tool used to manipulate others, and criticized those who taught it.

Kairos fits into the Sophistic scheme of rhetoric in conjunction with the ideas of prepon and dynaton. These two terms combined with kairos are their keys to successful rhetoric. As stated by Poulakos, prepon deals with the notion that "what is said must conform to both audience and occasion." Dynaton has to do with the idea of the possible, or what the speaker is attempting to convince the audience of. Kairos in the Sophistic context is based on the thought that speech must happen at a certain time in order for it to be most effective. If rhetoric is to be meaningful and successful, it must be presented at the right moment, or else it will not have the same impact on the members of the audience.

Aristotle and his followers also discuss the importance of kairos in their teachings. In his Rhetoric, one of the ways that Aristotle uses the idea of kairos is in reference to the specificity of each rhetorical situation. Kinneavy and Eskin identify 16 references to kairos in Aristotle's Rhetoric, arguing that the concept is integral to Aristotle's treatment of rhetoric, including his discussions of argument, style, and equity.

Aristotle believed that each rhetorical situation was different, and therefore different rhetorical devices needed to be applied at that point in time. One of the most well known parts of Aristotle's Rhetoric is when he discusses the roles of pathos, ethos, and logos. Aristotle ties kairos to these concepts, claiming that there are times in each rhetorical situation when one needs to be utilized over the others.

Kairos has classically been defined as a concept that focused on "the uniquely timely, the spontaneous, the radically particular." Ancient Pythagoreans thought kairos to be one of the most fundamental laws of the universe. Kairos was said to piece together the dualistic ways of the entire universe. Empedocles was the philosopher who connected kairos to the principle of opposites and harmony. It then became the principle of conflict and resolution and was thus inserted as a concept for rhetoric.

== Modern rhetorical definition ==
Aaron Hess (2011) submits a definition of kairos for the present day that bridges the two classical applications: Hess addresses Poulakos's view that, "In short, kairos dictates that what is said, must be said at the right time." He also suggests that in addition to timeliness, kairos considers appropriateness. According to Hess, kairos can either be understood as, "the decorum or propriety of any given moment and speech act, implying a reliance on the given or known", or as "the opportune, spontaneous, or timely." Although these two ideas of kairos might seem conflicting, Hess says that they offer a more extensive understanding of the term. Furthermore, they encourage creativity, which is necessary to adapt to unforeseen obstacles and opinions that can alter the opportune or appropriate moment, i.e. kairos. Being able to recognize the propriety of a situation while having the ability to adapt one's rhetoric allows taking advantage of kairos to be successful. Hess's updated definition of kairos concludes that along with taking advantage of the timeliness and appropriateness of a situation, the term also implies being knowledgeable of and involved in the environment where the situation is taking place in order to benefit fully from seizing the opportune moment. More recent scholarship has also examined kairos as a rhetorical framing of time. Lantz and Just describe kairos as involving both the recognition of an opportune moment and the creation of that moment through rhetorical action.

Hess's conflicting perspective on kairos is exemplified by the disagreement between Lloyd Bitzer (1968) and Richard Vatz (1983) about the 'rhetorical situation'. Bitzer argues that 'rhetorical situations' exist independent of human perspective; a situation invites discourse. He discusses the feeling of a missed opportunity (kairos) to speak and the tendency to create a later speech in response to that unseized moment. However, Vatz counters Bitzer's view by claiming that a situation is made rhetorical by the perception of its interpreter and the way which they choose to respond to it, whether with discourse or not. It is the rhetor's responsibility to give an event meaning through linguistic depiction. Both Bitzer's and Vatz' perspectives add depth to Hess's ideas that kairos is concerned with both timeliness and appropriateness. On one hand, Bitzer's argument supports Hess's claim that kairos is spontaneous, and one must be able to recognize the situation as opportune in order to take advantage of it. On the other hand, Vatz' idea that the rhetor is responsible reinforces Hess's suggestion of the need to be knowledgeable and involved in the surrounding environment in order to fully profit from the situation.

According to Bitzer, kairos is composed of exigence, audience, and constraints. Exigence is the inherent pressure to do something about a situation immediately, with the action required depending on the situation. The audience are the listeners who the rhetor is attempting to persuade. Constraints are the external factors that challenges the rhetor's ability to influence, such as the audience's personal beliefs and motivations.

Additionally, factors such as cultural background, previous social experiences, and current mood, can influence the capacity to see and understand the correct and opportune moment of action. Thus, the difficulty of using kairos in a modern rhetorical setting is understanding and working within its constraints, while also carefully considering unexpected situations and encounters that arise, in order to present one's rhetorical argument as naturally as possible.

There is no one word in today's English language that succinctly encompasses the meaning of kairos. Michael Harker (2007) says, "Like the 'points' on the rhetorical triangle, the meaning of kairos is not definitive but rather a starting point for grasping the whole of an argument." The inclusion of kairos in modern composition has not been implicitly made, but there are undertones. Various components of kairos are included in modern composition and have made profound effects on modern composition theory.

The purpose of kairos in modern rhetoric is mostly focused on the placement of logos, pathos and ethos. It is used as a "starting point" in modern rhetoric. Kelly Pender (2003) states the inclusion of kairos within discourse "would try to shift the focus of personal writing from the writer's experiences and emotions to a broader perspective that explicitly concentrates on the rhetorical situation ...." Kairos is an expressive inclusion within the overall subject of discourse, and one that has an effect on the entire rhetoric.

Christian Lundberg and William Keith (2008) describe kairos in their rhetoric guide as the concept that "there is an exact right time to deliver a message if the audience is to be persuaded." Concepts such as relevance, recent events, and who the audience is play a role in determining the right moment to speak. Which has to do with the implications of the original definition for kairos. This implication is if "the target was moving and the soldier only had a narrow gap, the timing of the shot was crucial."

Douglas Downs (2016) defines kairos as the principle of rhetors having little influence over their discourse, which causes them to convey what makes sense in the moment. Kairos serves as a reminder that many of the topics rhetors will respond to are well out of their scope of control.

== In Christian theology ==
In the New Testament, kairos means "the appointed time in the purpose of God," the time when God acts (e.g. Mark 1:15: the kairos is fulfilled and the kingdom of God is at hand). Kairos (used 86 times in the New Testament) refers to an opportune time, a "moment" or a "season" such as "harvest time", whereas chronos (used 54 times) refers to a specific amount of time, such as a day or an hour (e.g. Acts 13:18 and 27:9). Jesus makes a distinction in John 7:6 between "His" time and "His brothers'" time: paradoxically, it is "always" (Greek: πάντοτε) his brothers' time. In the context, they can go to Jerusalem any time they wish.

In the Eastern Orthodox and Eastern Catholic churches, before the Divine Liturgy begins, the Deacon exclaims to the Priest, Kairos tou poiēsai tō Kyriō (Καιρὸς τοῦ ποιῆσαι τῷ Κυρίῳ), i.e. 'It is time [kairos] for the Lord to act', indicating that the time of the Liturgy is an intersection with Eternity.

In The Interpretation of History, neo-orthodox Lutheran theologian Paul Tillich made prominent use of the term. For him, the kairoi are those crises in history (see Christian existentialism) which create an opportunity for, and indeed demand, an existential decision by the human subject—the coming of Christ being the prime example (compare Karl Barth's use of Geschichte as opposed to Historie). In the Kairos Document, an example of liberation theology in South Africa under apartheid, the term kairos is used to denote "the appointed time," "the crucial time" into which the document or text is spoken.

The Kairos Prison Ministry is active in 39 U.S. states.

== In science ==
In Hippocrates' (460–357 BCE) major theoretical treatises on the nature of medical science and methodology, the term kairos is used within the first line. Hippocrates is generally accepted as the father of medicine, but his contribution to the discourse of science is less discussed. While kairos most often refers to "the right time," Hippocrates also used the term when referencing experimentation. Using this term allowed him to "express the variable components of medical practice more accurately." Here the word refers more to proportion, the mean, and the implicit sense of right measure.

Hippocrates most famous quote about kairos is "every kairos is a chronos, but not every chronos is a kairos."

In A Rhetoric of Doing: Essays on Written Discourse in Honor of James L. Kinneavy by Stephen Paul Witte, Neil Nakadate, and Roger Dennis Cherry (1992) also discusses the art of kairos in the field of science. Citing John Swales, the essay notes that the introduction sections of scientific research articles are nothing more than the construction of openings. This idea derives from the spatial aspect of kairos, or the creation of "an opening," which can be created by writers and discovered by readers. This opening is the opportune time, or kairos. Swales created what he called the "create a research space" model, wherein kairos, or an opening, was constructed. It consisted of four rhetorical moves:

(1) establishing the field;

(2) summarizing previous research;

(3) preparing for present research; and

(4) introducing the present research.

Step (3) is where a gap in previous research is indicated, thus creating the need for more information. The writer constructs a need, and an opening. Because kairos emphasizes change, it is an important aspect of science. Not all scientific research can be presented at the same time or in the same way, but creating an opening makes it possible to construct the right time.

This can easily be related back to Hippocrates's statement that not every opening is an opportunity. Yet, in science, the message can be adapted in such a way that chronos becomes kairos.

The idea can also be expressed as Carolyn Glasshoff (2011) wrote, that specifically in the field of scientific writing,

any text must be influenced by the kairos that exists both before the text is created and during the presentation. In addition, each text helps create a new kairos for texts that come after.

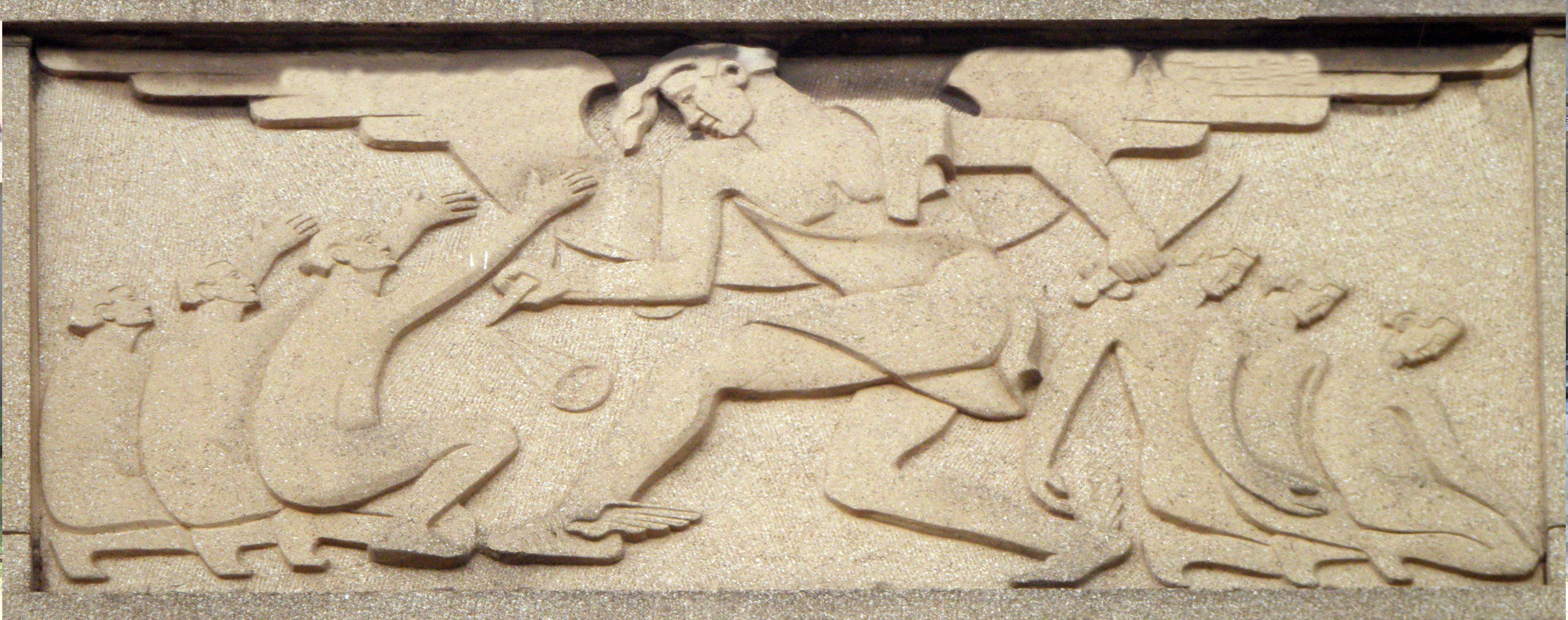
Modern Cairo relief by Dutch artist Janny Brugman-de Vries on the former Alexander Hegius gymnasium on the Nieuwe Markt in Deventer in the Netherlands

== In digital media ==
Some scholars studying kairos in the modern digital sphere argue that the aspects of body/identity, distribution/circulation, access/accessibility, interaction, and economics are handled differently in an online setting and therefore messages that are sent digitally need to be altered to fit the new circumstances. In order to reach online audiences effectively, scholars suggest that context of the information's use, which includes considerations of legal, health-related, disciplinary, and political factors paired with smart rhetorical thinking can solve the issue of miscommunicated messages distributed on online forums.

== See also ==
- Carpe diem
- Ichi-go ichi-e
- Kairosis
- Kāla (time)
- Kairos (Madeleine L'Engle)
- Modes of persuasion
- Rhetorical velocity
- Ṛtú
