= John Poulakos =

American professor & author (born 1948)

John Poulakos (born 1948) has worked in the field of rhetoric as a professor and author, contributing to the study of classical rhetoric.

== Biography ==
Poulakos received his MA from California State University, San Jose in 1972 with a thesis "Toward an existential theory of dialogue". PhD in communications from the University of Kansas in 1979 with a thesis "Gorgias on rhetoric". Poulakos moved to Pittsburgh, Pennsylvania, and was an associate professor of communication and rhetoric at the University of Pittsburgh.

== Academic work ==
At Pittsburgh, Poulakos specializes in classical rhetorical theory, philosophy and rhetoric, and history of rhetoric. His publications have promoted the work and importance of the Sophists in Ancient Greece, who were often overlooked due to Plato's harsh criticism. In 1996, Poulakos was given the Everett Lee Hunt Award for Distinguished Scholarship in Rhetoric, along with the Winans/Wichelns Award for Distinguished Scholarship in Rhetoric.

=== Main themes ===
Poulakos says that sophistry, as a rhetorical era, has been bogged down by philosophers like Plato, and deserves more respect and contemporary appreciation. Poulakos' main concern is that the importance in sophistic discourse can be broken down into five different points: rhetoric is an art, style can be used as personal expression, kairos, which is the opportune moment, to prepon, also known as the appropriate moment, and to dynaton, meaning "the possible." Sophistry has influenced three modern rhetorical practices: the logic of circumstances, the ethic of competition, and the aesthetic of exhibition.

== Published books ==
- Possibility of Rhetoric's Early Beginnings: : the Van Zelst Lecture in communication, May 14, 1991 (1991)
- Sophistical Rhetoric in Classical Greece (1997) According to WorldCat, the book is held in 951 libraries
- Classical Rhetorical Theory (1999) Co-writer with Takis Poulakos According to WorldCat, the book is held in 102 libraries
- Classical Rhetorics and Rhetoricians:: critical studies and sources, ed. M Balif & MG Moran (2005) Wrote section on Gorgias
