= Illuminare – Centre for the Study of Medieval Art =

Illuminare – Centre for the Study of Medieval Art KU Leuven, is a university-led research and documentation centre. It is situated in the University Library (Ladeuzeplein in Leuven) in the town of Leuven, Belgium and is accessible to both academics and students. The focus on Medieval and Early Modern Art from the Southern Low Countries in a European perspective is facilitated by both research and doctoral projects that are in turn supported by a vast international network of universities, institutions, and museums.

== Research ==
Illuminare conserves and catalogues illuminated manuscripts and carries out art technical research (Book Heritage Lab). Recent research and conservation projects performed by the Book Heritage Lab, include the Codex Eyckensis (8th century) (2016/18), the illuminated manuscripts from the Mayer van den Bergh Museum (2014/19), the technological study of the Enclosed Gardens of Mechelen (Art Garden, 2016/20) and the Bruegel drawings and prints project (Fingerprint 2016/20). Equally, Illuminare examines, through an interdisciplinary approach, the iconology of Medieval Art (Iconology Research Group). Recent research projects of the Iconology Research Group have been, among others, the study of the phenomenon of the 'John the Baptist's head on a platter' (2012/16), the study of liturgical objects and their use in Belgian collections (OrnaSacra, 2017/21), and the examination of the afterlife of the figure of Kairos (2017/21). The research centre holds and manages several research archives previously belonging to renowned art historians such as Maurits Smeyers, Bert Cardon, Jan Karel Steppe, Antoine De Schrijver, and Hans Nieuwdorp.

== Exhibitions ==
Illuminare organises national and international exhibitions; the most recent exhibitions include, In Search of Utopia (2016/17, M-Museum of Leuven); Hieronymus Cock - The Renaissance in Print (2013, M-Museum of Leuven and Fondation Custodia, Paris); Magnificent Middle Ages (2013, Museum Plantin-Moretus, Antwerp); The Anjou Bible - A Royal Manuscript Revealed (2010, M-Museum of Leuven) and Rogier van der Weyden 1400/1464 – Master of Passions (2009, M-Museum of Leuven)

== Publications ==
In addition, the research centre publishes four in-house publications: Corpus of Illuminated Manuscripts, Art and Religion, Studies in Iconology, and Iconologies. Illuminare also produces exhibition catalogues and colloquium proceedings. In 2017, the Royal Flemish Academy for Sciences and the Arts bestowed the whole Illuminare team with the annual Science Communication Prize, in recognition of the exhibition In Search of Utopia.
