= Purgation =

Purgation may refer to:

- Inducing bowel movement with a laxative
- The purification of the soul
  - In this life, see State (theology)
  - In Purgatory
- Purgation (album), Trigger the Bloodshed album
- In US patent law, purgation of misuse refers to discontinuance of a restrictive practice and dissipation of its adverse results – see B.B. Chemical Co. v. Ellis
