= Lieven van Lathem =

15th century Netherlandish painter and manuscript illuminator

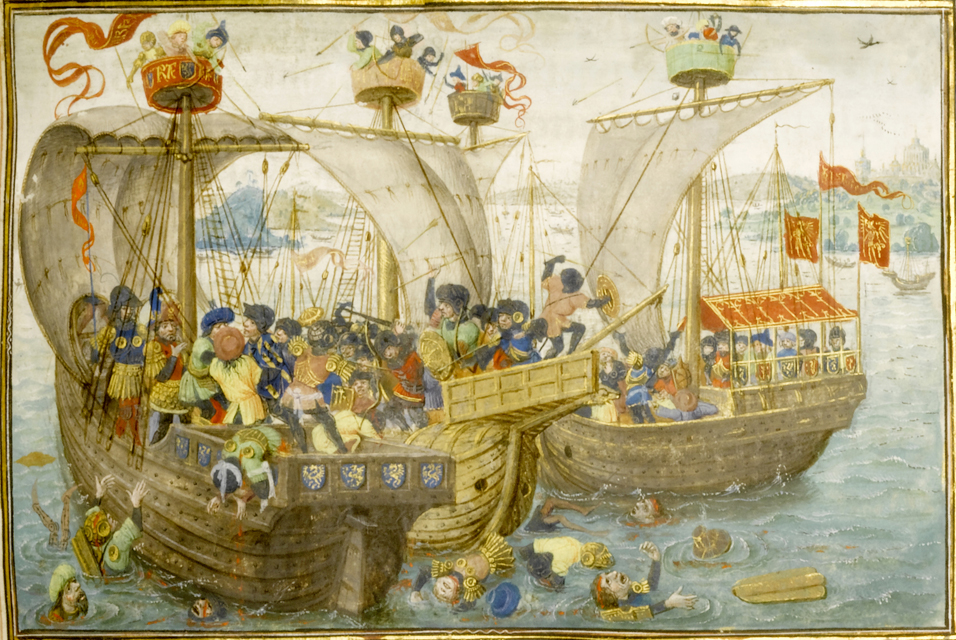
A Naval Battle

Lieven van Lathem (1430–1493) was an Early Netherlandish painter and manuscript illuminator.

== Career ==
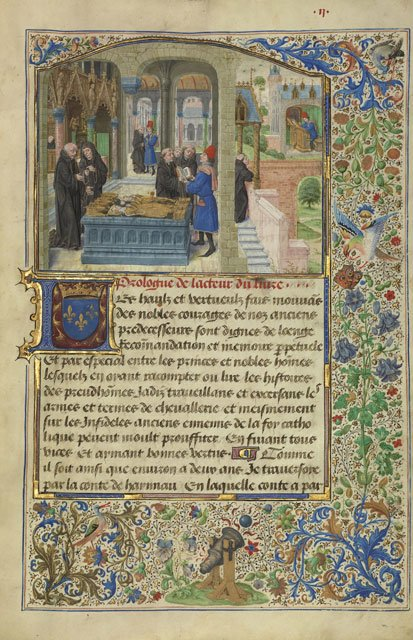
The Author Hears the Story of Gillion de Trazegnies, by calligrapher David Aubert; the painting is by Lathem

He was born in Ghent. Lieven van Lathem worked for a range of patrons, including the dukes of Burgundy, Philip the Good and Charles the Bold. A member of the painters' guilds in Ghent and Antwerp, van Lathem worked with other contemporary Flemish illuminators, including the Master of Mary of Burgundy and Nicolas Spierinc. He was influenced by the Netherlandish panel painters Jan van Eyck and Dieric Bouts. Like many artists working at fifteenth-century courts, van Lathem worked in more than one medium. He helped prepare decorations for an assembly of the Order of the Golden Fleece and for the wedding festivities celebrating the marriage of Charles the Bold to Margaret of York, held in Bruges in 1468. He contributed to the Hours of Mary of Burgundy.

Though van Lathem is known for oil paintings as well as manuscripts, no paintings are currently attributed to him. His son Jacob van Lathem became a painter, and his son Lieven the Younger became a goldsmith. Lieven van Lathem died in Antwerp in 1493.

Around the year 1515, an Italian banker in Bruges, Jerome Frescobaldi, loaned money to Margaret of Austria, Duchess of Savoy, Governor of the Netherlands, on an inventory of some of her jewelled tableware. The pieces were weighed and valued by the goldsmith Lieven van Lathem, the son of the painter.
