= Kącik Street =

Street in Kraków, Poland

Kącik street
Kraków
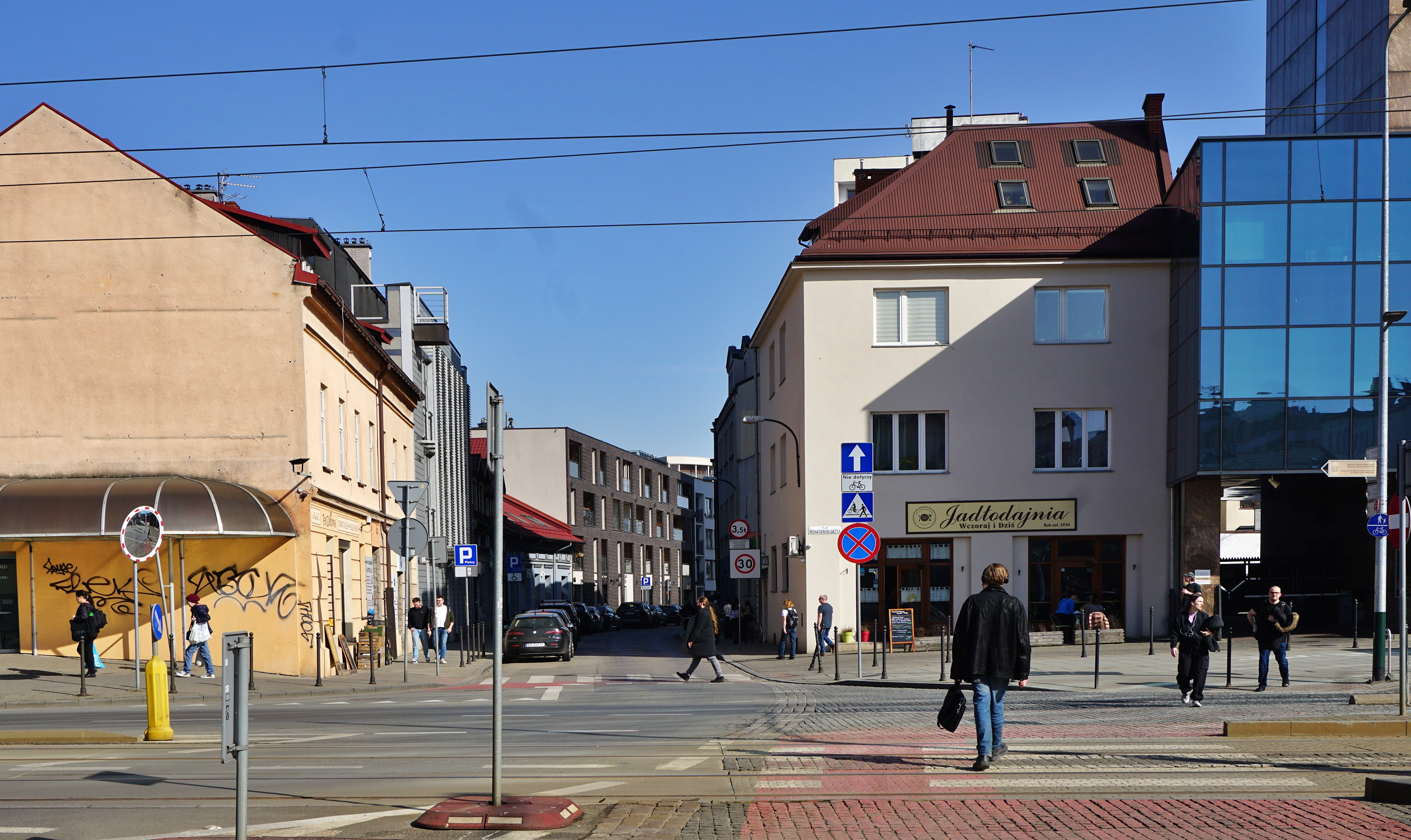
- View from Bohaterów Getta Square to the east
- Interactive map of Kącik street
- Part of: Kraków Podgórze
- Owner: City of Kraków
- Location: Kraków, Poland

Kącik Street is a street in Kraków, in district Podgórze. In the Middle Ages, a road to Niepołomice and Mogiła passed through this area. The street was established at the end of the 19th century. Its name, which refers to its location in a "corner" (kącik), was first mentioned in 1880 and officially approved in 1926.

The historic house at number 10, built in 1889, is listed in the Kraków Municipal Register of Historic Buildings. It was designed by Stanisław Serkowski.

In 1921, the building at number 2 (5) became the headquarters of the Kraków congregation of the Bible Students (now known as Jehovah's Witnesses), which also served as their meeting hall.

Between 1941 and 1943, the street was part of the Kraków Ghetto and formed part of its northern boundary. Between Kącik Street and the corner building at Plac Zgody (now Plac Bohaterów Getta), there was one of the four gates leading into the ghetto (Gate IV).

In 1979, the Kraków Zabłocie railway stop was opened near Kącik Street on railway line No. 91. A pedestrian tunnel runs under the railway line, connecting Kącik Street and Traugutta Street with Lipowa Street.

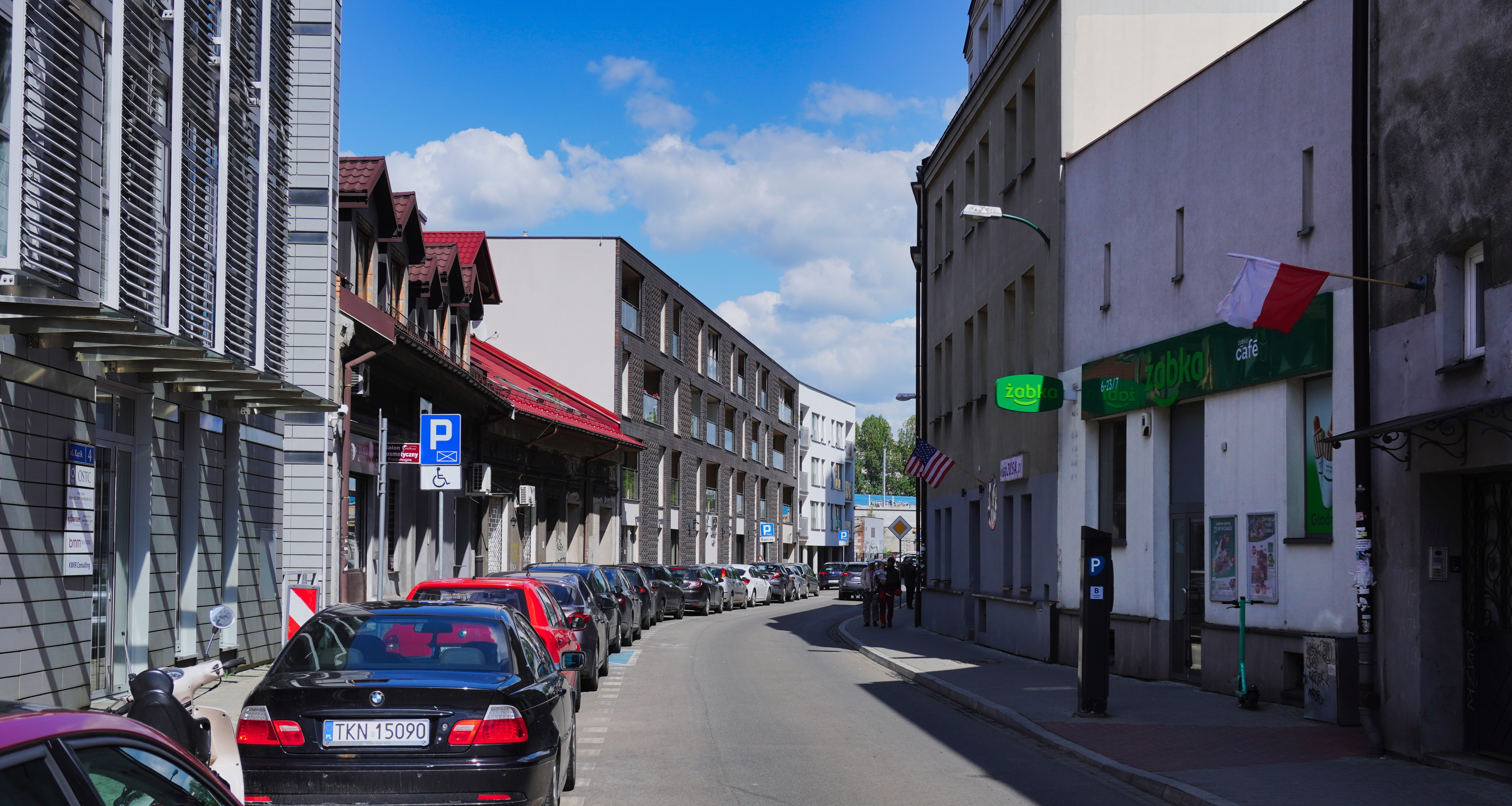
View to the east (2021)
