= Stanisław Samostrzelnik =

Polish Renaissance painter, miniaturist, decorator and Cistercian monk

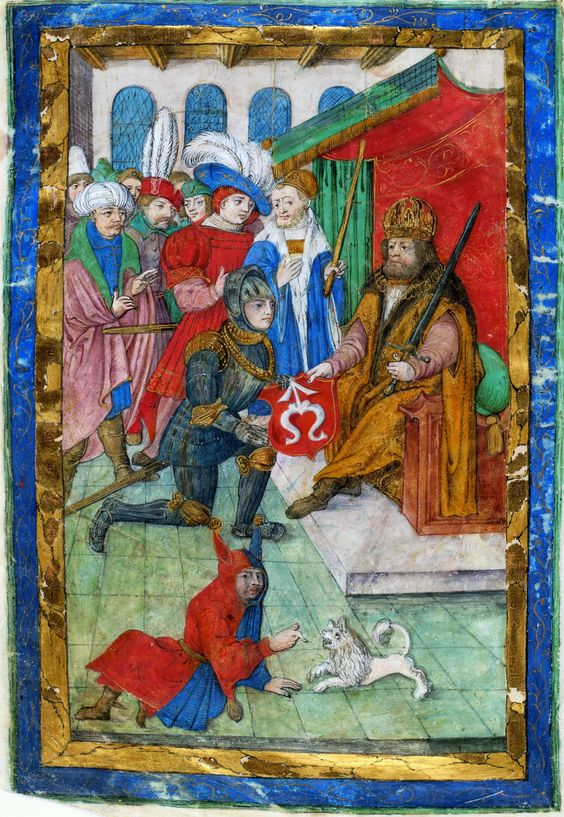
- Liber geneseos illustris familiae Schidloviciae from 1532
- Born: c. 1490
- Died: 1541; Mogiła, near Kraków in Poland
- Known for: Painting
- Movement: Renaissance
- Patrons: Piotr Tomicki, Krzysztof Szydłowiecki

Stanisław Samostrzelnik (Stanisław z Krakowa, Stanisław z Mogiły, c. 1490–1541) was a Polish Renaissance painter, miniaturist, decorator and Cistercian monk from Kraków, Poland. He was the first Polish painter known by name who painted in the Renaissance style. There are many frescos by him in the churches of southern Poland. The most distinguished can be seen in the Cistercian monastery in Mogiła. He is also recognized for his portrait of Bishop Piotr Tomicki in the portrait gallery of the Church of St. Francis of Assisi, Kraków.

== Life ==
Stanisław Samostrzelnik was a son of Piotr and Anna Samostrzelnik, who lived in the Kraków mansion of Cistercian Abbot of Koprzywnica. His father was probably a manufacturer of crossbows and bows, hence the name in old Polish (samostrzelnik from Latin sagittator, a crossbow maker). Samostrzelnik, after passing the necessary examinations, entered the Cistercian Abbey in Mogiła near Kraków, which at that time was a separate town, and today is in the urban area of Kraków, Nowa Huta. Thanks to the Abbot's protection, he quickly advanced to exposed monastic position of illuminator. The first fully proven chronological information about him appears in the 1506, when he undertook the work to decorate the vaults of the monastery. He was mentioned as a pictor de Mogila, painter of the Cistercian Abbey. From that time he used the new name Stanislaus Claratumbensis (Stanisław of Mogiła) derived from the Latin name of Mogiła Abbey, Clara Tumba (Holy Tomb). In 1511 he was awarded the right to live outside the monastery and moved to Szydłowiec to work for the town's owner, Krzysztof Szydłowiecki, castellan of Sandomierz, who was widely known as a patron of arts. Stanisław Samostrzelnik is best known for his ornate miniature paintings in a genealogical book of the Szydłowiecki family ("Liber genesos illustris Familiae Shidlovicae"). In the course of this work as a court painter, he realized numerous minor commissions for the Szydłowiecki family, decorating the local church and castle. He also served as the castellan's chaplain in the years 1510-1530. From his patron, he received a parsonage in Grocholice near Ćmielów in 1513. In 1514, he moved with Szydłowiecki to Opatów, and after the latter's death in 1532, returned to Mogiła.

Upon his return he established his own workshop in Kraków at Świdniecka Street, where he received commissions from the local patriciate, clergy and the royal court (including the Prayer Book of Queen Bona Sforza). For Bishop Piotr Tomicki he adorned the Enumeration of the Bishops of Gniezno by Jan Długosz (Catalogus archiepiscoporum Gnesnensium) and his chapel at Wawel Cathedral. In 1534 the Bishop commissioned to decorate wax figures of him, intended as votive offerings in the most important shrines of the kingdom.

Samostrzelnik decorated the prayer book of Princess Jadwiga Jagiellon (1535), a document of peace treaty with Ottoman Empire (1533), and the banner for Albrecht Hohenzollern. He also painted religious scenes in a church in Mogiła, and decorated the ceiling of the adjoining library. Stanisław Samostrzelnik died in Mogiła Abbey in 1541.

== Works and style ==
The main works by Stanisław Samostrzelnik include illuminations of four prayer books: Hours of King Sigismund I the Old (1524, London, British Library), Hours of Queen Bona Sforza (1527, Oxford, Bodleian Library), Krzysztof Szydłowiecki Prayer Book (1527, now divided between the Archivio Storico Civico and the Biblioteca Ambrosiana in Milan) and Vaitiekus Goštautas Prayer Book (1528, Munich, Universitätsbibliothek), along with miniatures of "Liber genesos illustris Familiae Shidlovicae" (1531–1532, Kórnik, Library of the Polish Academy of Sciences), Catalogus archiepiscoporum Gnesnensium (1530–1535, Warsaw, National Library) and the Gospel of Piotr Tomicki (1534, Kraków, Metropolitan Chapter Archives).

A characteristic feature of Samostrzelnik's miniatures is live, often contrasting color and Renaissance style referring to the Gothic tradition. From around 1520 inspirations of German masters (Albrecht Altdorfer, Lucas Cranach the Elder and Albrecht Dürer) of the time are evident in his works as well as the influence of the Danube school, acquired during his stay in Vienna where he went in 1515 as Szydlowiecki's chaplain. In addition to the Danube school influences, the Dutch patterns and indirect connections with the Italian painting (ornamental and heraldic motifs, acquired during his stay in Hungary in 1514) are visible in his work. Samostrzelnik's decorative paintings combine figural scene and ornament. All the figures are not subjected to excessive idealization and characterised very individually, usually dressed in contemporary clothes and in keeping with the artist's tendency to portrait realism.

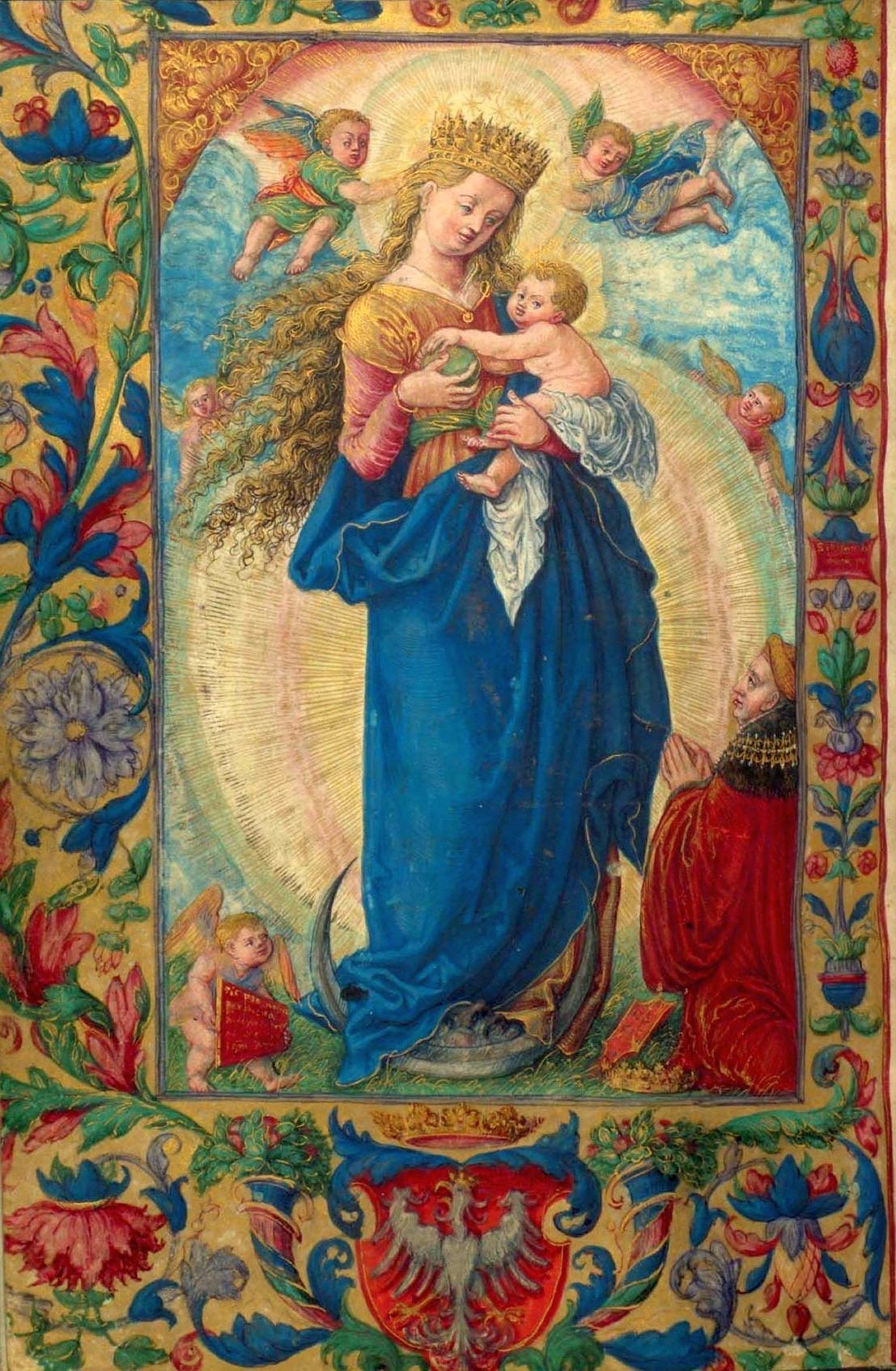
Prayer Book of Sigismund I of Poland (1524), British Library.

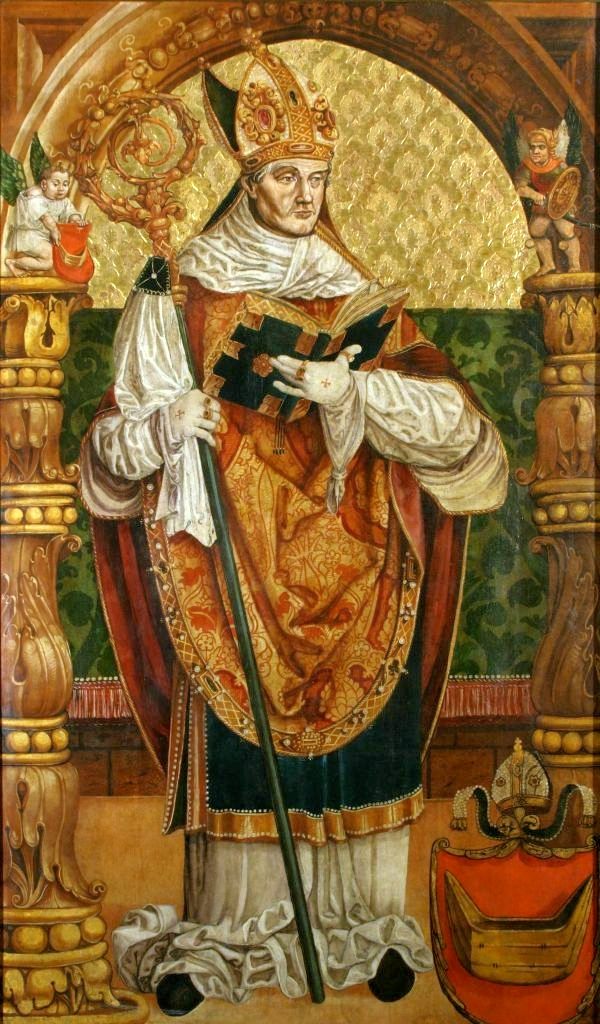
Portrait of bishop Piotr Tomicki (c. 1530), Church of St. Francis of Assisi, Kraków

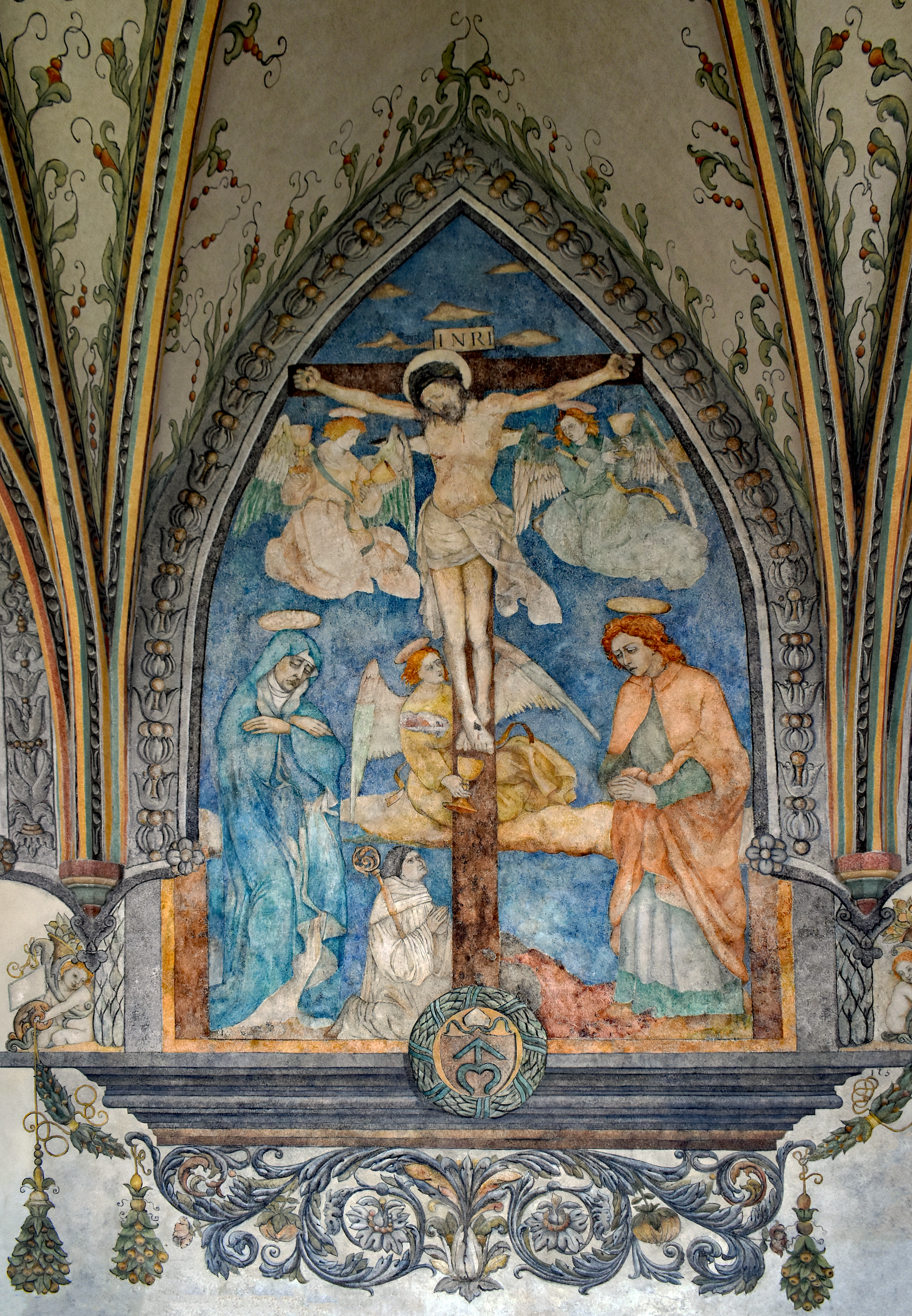
Crucifixion (polychrome, 1530-1541)
Kraków, Cistercian Abbey in Mogiła (cloisters).

== See also ==
- Renaissance in Poland
- Miniature (illuminated manuscript)
