= Catalogue of the Archbishops of Gniezno =

Illuminated manuscript by Jan Długosz

- National Library of Poland
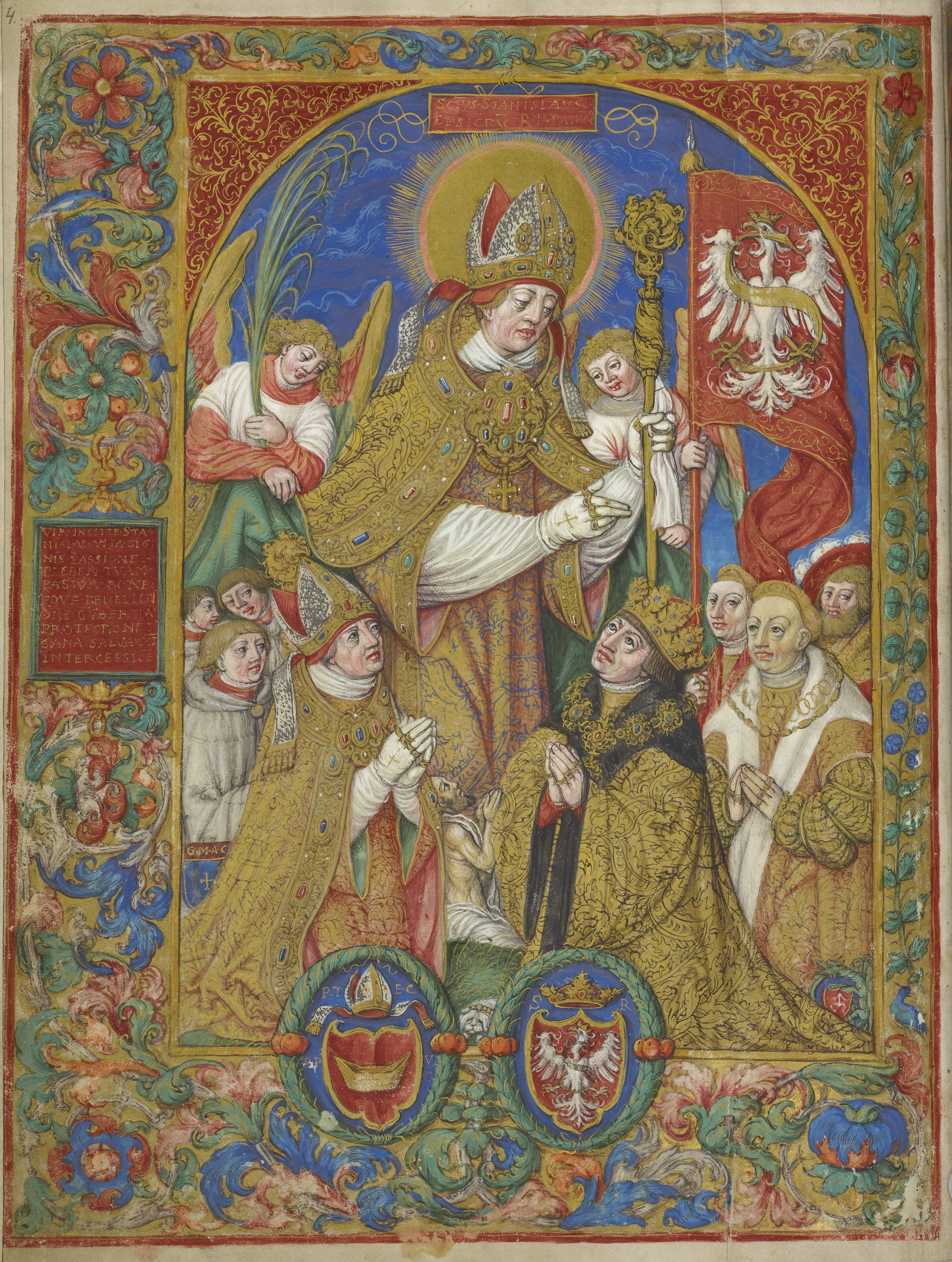
- St Stanislaus
- Also known as: Catalogus archiepiscoporum Gnesnensium
- Type: codex
- Date: 1531–1535
- Place of origin: Kraków
- Language(s): Latin
- Author(s): Jan Długosz
- Illuminated by: Stanisław Samostrzelnik
- Patron: Piotr Tomicki
- Material: parchment
- Size: 31 cm × 24 cm (12.2 in × 9.4 in)
- Accession: Rps BOZ 5

Catalogue of the Archbishops of Gniezno (Latin: Catalogus archiepiscoporum Gnesnensium, Polish: Katalog arcybiskupów gnieźnieńskich) is an illuminated manuscript by Jan Długosz. It was illustrated by Stanisław Samostrzelnik.

== History ==
The Catalogue is a copy of a work written by Jan Długosz in 1460–1472. It contains biographies of successive archbishops of Gniezno, the primates of Poland. The manuscript was commissioned by Cracow Bishop Piotr Tomicki and produced between 1531 and 1535. After the bishop's death, the manuscript became the property of his nephew, Primate Andrzej Krzycki. A next owner, Jan Zamoyski, offered the manuscript to the library of the Zamoyski Academy. It was transferred to the Library of the Zamoyski Estate at the beginning of the 19th century. In 1944 it was taken from Warsaw to Goerbitsch by the Germans. From there, the Russians transported it to Moscow. It returned to the National Library of Poland in 1947. Since May 2024, the manuscript has been exhibited at a permanent exhibition in the Palace of the Commonwealth in Warsaw.

== Description ==
The author presented the archbishops of Gniezno and the bishops of Krakow in chronological order. There are also informations on their families, activity and the churches they founded.

The Catalogue's illuminations was done by Stanisław Samostrzelnik, his colleagues and imitators. The manuscripts contains 46 full-page or half-page miniatures and 26 unfinished miniatures. Bishops are portrayed within various chambers, seated on thrones or stone benches, less often at the pulpit. The miniatures feature the coats of arms of dignitaries, or sometimes the images of their patron saints. The borders of some pages feature medallions images of Poland's old rulers.

The manuscript page size is 31 cm × 24 cm (12.2 in × 9.4 in). It has 145 leaves (290 pages).

== Bibliography ==
- Makowski, Tomasz; Sapała, Patryk, eds. (2024). The Palace of the Commonwealth. Three times opened. Treasures from the National Library of Poland at the Palace of the Commonwealth. Warsaw: National Library of Poland.
- Tchórzewska-Kabata, Halina; Dąbrowski, Maciej, eds. (2003). More precious than gold. Treasures of the Polish National Library (electronic version) (PDF). Translated by Dorosz, Janina. Warsaw: National Library of Poland. ISBN 83-7009-402-3.
