= Prayer Book of Queen Bona =

Manuscript of the book of hours

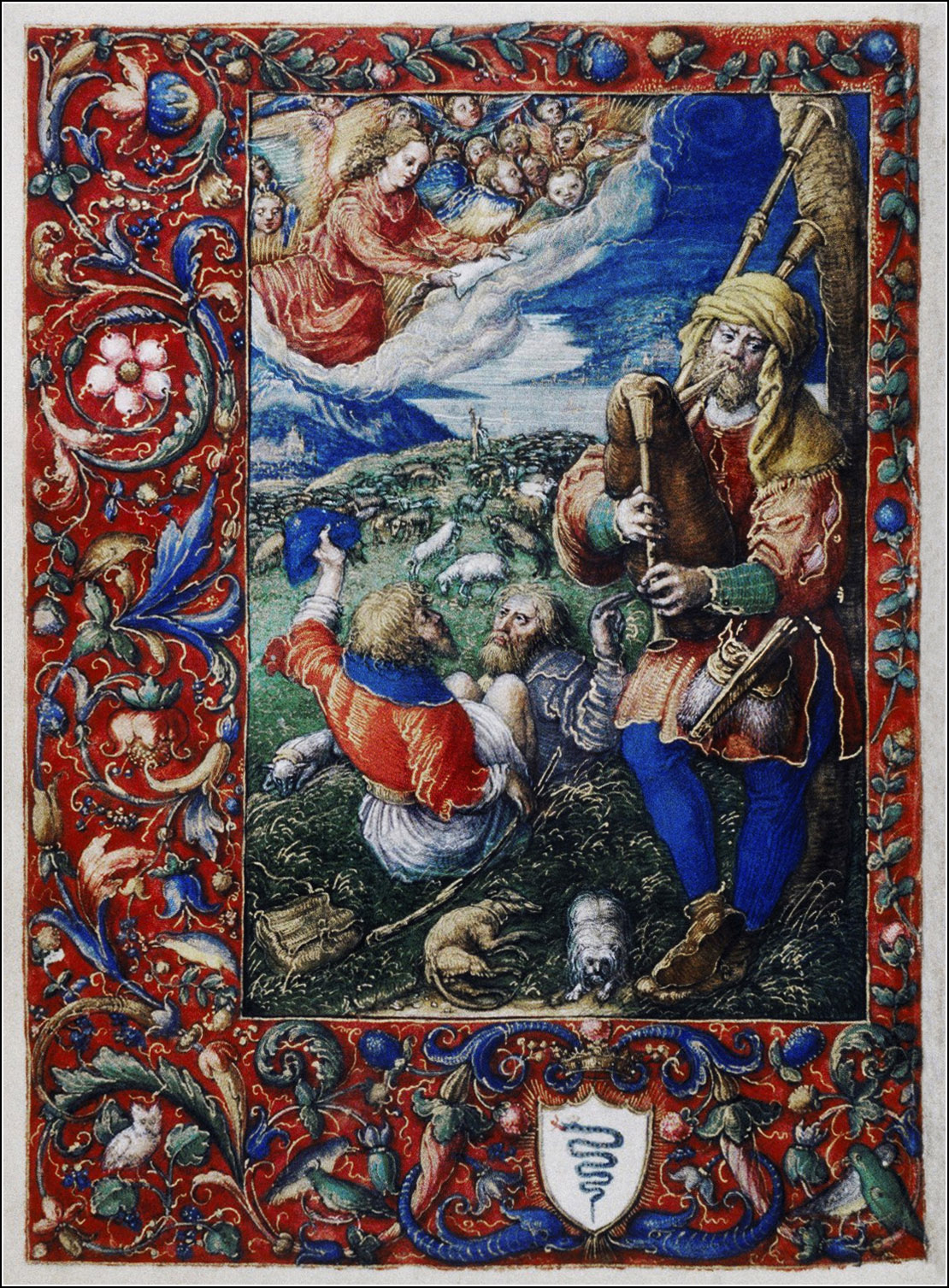
- Annunciation to the Shepherds featuring a figure modeled on The Bagpiper by Dürer (1514) and the coat of arms of the manuscript's owner (the Sforza Serpent)
- Artist: Stanisław Samostrzelnik
- Year: c. 1521, 1527–1528
- Medium: ink, tempera, gold paint on parchment
- Dimensions: 143×114 mm
- Location: Bodleian Library

Prayer Book of Queen Bona, or the Book of Hours of Queen Bona, is an illuminated manuscript of the book of hours, created in the 1520s by the Polish Renaissance painter and illuminator Stanisław Samostrzelnik and his collaborators. The manuscript was intended for Queen Bona of the Sforza family – the second wife of Sigismund I the Old.

The codex, measuring 143×114 mm and consisting of 271 parchment leaves (including three additional ones), contains the text of the Book of Hours written in Latin in a single column, as well as a concluding prayer in Italian. The signed and dated decoration includes 15 full-page miniatures, borders, and ornamental initials. Since 1834, the manuscript has been part of the Bodleian Library collection in Oxford (catalogue number Douce 40/21 614).

The miniature decoration of Book of Hours of Queen Bona, representing the pinnacle of Samostrzelnik's artistic achievements, is considered one of the most valuable monuments of Polish Renaissance painting.

== Time and circumstances of creation ==
The manuscript was created in the 1520s. A significant date for determining the time of the text's creation is 1521, the year of Pope Leo X's death. His name is mentioned in the form of the initial L on one of the manuscript's leaves, in a prayer for the pope (fol. 144r). The date inscribed in Roman numerals A° MDXXVII, visible on one of the miniatures (fol. 36v), is crucial for establishing the time of the manuscript's decoration. The dating of Book of Hours of Queen Bona is thus confined to the period between about 1521 and 1527, with a possible extension of the completion of the paintings to 1528.

The person for whom the manuscript was intended is clearly identified by the heraldic decoration present on 12 leaves of the manuscript – the family coats of arms of the Sforza, Visconti, and Neapolitan Aragon (the Trastámara cadet line) families, as well as the state emblems of the Crown of the Kingdom of Poland (the White Eagle) and the Grand Duchy of Lithuania (Pahonia). In addition, Queen Bona's personal motto Cetera parvi and her initials S B R P (Latin: Serenissima Bona Regina Poloniae) are present, along with the name Bona mentioned in one of the prayers. It is likely that the book of hours was commissioned by Sigismund I the Old as a gift for his wife.

== Content layout of the manuscript ==
The manuscript, intended for Queen Bona's private use, belongs to the type of livres d'heures (horaria) common in Western Europe, popularly known as books of hours, which contain prayers to the Mother of God and the saints.

However, the prayer book includes texts that differ significantly from the program of typical books of hours. Among the texts of different origins are the Marian litany, an extended service against enemies, and prayers for protection against the plague, which also contain elements typical of spells, particularly the personalized prayer in Italian Signor Dio Misericordioso with Queen Bona's name.

The manuscript, made in Poland, is largely modeled on the text of a 15th-century prayer book (Book of Hours of Queen Bona) that the queen brought from Bari, although there are some differences between them.

Part of the prayer book	Leaves	Content and description
Calendar	1r–12v	The calendar was copied from an unknown Northern Italian source, dated to 1425–1430. Festivities requiring mandatory participation in the Holy Mass (festa fori), which were not linked to the movable Easter cycle, were marked in gold. The liturgical celebrations of saints included in the calendar are associated with the patrons of Northern Italy, Southern Spain, and Southern France. A total of 351 feasts were recorded. The pages with the months of the calendar in Queen Bona's prayer book are adorned with illuminated zodiac signs. The headers provide information about the number of days in calendar and lunar months, golden numbers indicating the dates of the new moon in the 19-year lunar cycle, and weekday letters for determining the days of the week in the 28-year solar cycle. This knowledge, aside from enabling the determination of Easter dates, allowed for identifying ominous and favorable days for certain activities, such as medical and cosmetic procedures.
Gospel fragments	13r–19r	After the calendar, the main prayer book begins. The opening section contains selected fragments of the four canonical Gospels, traditionally placed at the beginning or end of livres d'heures. Reading and memorizing these verses were considered a protective measure against Satan.
The Passion according to Saint John	21r–33r	Following the Gospel fragments is the Passio Domini nostri Iesu Xristi secundum Joannem, with the text divided into roles of Christ, the synagogue, and the cantor. Including the Passion in a dramatized form facilitated participation in Holy Week ceremonies. The text was also read at the bedside of the dying, before the priest arrived with the viaticum. Before the text, there is an illumination depicting Christ's prayer in Gethsemane (fol. 20v). A few blank pages were left after the Passion (fol. 33v–36r).
The Little Office of the Blessed Virgin Mary	37r–113r	The Officium Beate Marie Virginis secundum consuetudinem Romane curie is a simplified Marian office in breviary form, following the Roman Curia's arrangement. Each hour ends with special prayers to All Saints (suffragia). The concluding paraphrase of the Ave Maria prayer was updated in response to the Reformation, containing a plea to preserve the purity of Catholic doctrine, presenting the Mother of God as the guardian of the queen's fidelity to the church. This section is accompanied by a cycle of miniatures depicting scenes from the Virgin Mary's life, from the Annunciation (fol. 36v) to the Massacre of the Innocents (fol. 87v).
Votive Mass	114r–117r	An illumination depicting Mary with the Child (fol. 113v) precedes the sung Mass (votive) Salve Sancta Parens, celebrated on Saturdays in honor of the Mother of God. Queen Bona's prayer book is a rare example of Central European books of hours containing a liturgical text, which is more commonly found only in Italy and Flanders.
Penitential psalms	123r–135v	The Psalmi penitenciales are preceded by an illumination of King David in penance (fol. 122v). Each of the seven deadly sins is countered by one of the seven penitential psalms, serving as a shield against the roots of evil in humans.
Litany of All Saints	135r–141r	The short litany, derived from the Italian book of hours belonging to the queen, was supplemented with the names of the patrons of the Kingdom of Poland and saints particularly venerated in Kraków – Florian, Stanislaus of Szczepanów, Wenceslaus I, and Adalbert of Prague – reflecting Queen Bona's adoption of their cult.
Collection of prayers	142r–145r	This thematically diverse collection includes prayers for family members, benefactors, and deceased loved ones, as well as a prayer for the pope.
Athanasian Creed	146r–149v; 242r–245v	The Quicumque vult salvus esse, associated with the breviary office, was included outside the liturgical part of Queen Bona's prayer book, and even twice. It serves as a kind of commentary on the Nicene Creed, being both a profession of faith and an explanation of the doctrine of the Holy Trinity.
Office for the dead	151r–196r	An illumination depicting the salvation of sinners' souls from purgatory (fol. 150v) opens the Officium mortuorum. This service, recited for the dead, was also read during the night vigil at the body. The prayers for the souls of the dead repeat the text of the officium defunctorum from Queen Bona's Italian prayer book, differing only by the addition of three prayers for deceased family members of the queen.
Passion offices	198r–203r; 204r–228r	Queen Bona's prayer book includes both the small and large office of the True Cross, also known as the Hours of the Passion. The Officium Sancte Crucis magnum is accompanied by an illumination of the Crucifixion (fol. 197v) and a depiction of the Descent from the Cross (fol. 222v).
Office of the Holy Spirit	230r–234r	The small hours of the Holy Spirit belong to the abbreviated type of Officium Sancti Spiritus. They are preceded by an illumination of the scene of Pentecost (fol. 229v).
Litany to the Mother of God	235r–242r	The Letanie Marie Virginis is an unusual prayer for books of hours and is one of the oldest Marian litanies known from Poland. Different from the Litany of the Blessed Virgin Mary, it repeats the text of a litany found in the preserved prayer book of Isabella of Aragon, Queen Bona's mother, dating from between 1511 and 1518 and kept in the Trivulziana Library in Milan (manuscript cod. 2144).
Prayers against enemies	242r–245v	Preceded by the Athanasian Creed, which is repeated in the prayer book, the psalms contra inimicos, prayers, and a benediction form a type of service meant to provide effective protection against the schemes of enemies. One of the orations, containing the plea da mihi famule tue Bone victoriam contra inimicos meos, repeats, in a slightly modified form, the text of a prayer by Isabella of Aragon for her daughter.
Prayers against the plague	252r–252r	A service to Saint Sebastian, regarded as a particularly effective protector against the plague, and the prayer Recordare domine mia were intended as remedies against the plague. Both texts contain elements of a magical nature, related to the symbolism of Hebrew (JHWH) and Greek (T) letters, meant to enhance the protective power of the prayers. Their inclusion in Queen Bona's prayer book was connected to the recurring epidemics in Kraków, which often forced the queen to seek refuge in royal or Lithuanian residences.
Italian prayer	252v–256r	The prayer Signor Dio Misericordioso in the queen's native language, characterized by the most personal tone, concludes the Latin text of Queen Bona's book of hours.

The lettering styles used in the Book of Hours of Queen Bona align with Renaissance aesthetics. The text was written in a humanistic minuscule (littera antiqua tonda), combined in the titles of individual sections of the prayer book with Roman square capitals. The text, created around 1521, was supplemented a few years later with illuminations painted on parchment of a different thickness than that used for the written pages.

== Miniature decoration ==
The iconographic program of the miniatures differs significantly from Queen Bona's Italian book of hours and is more closely related to other prayer books created by Stanisław Samostrzelnik, especially those intended for chancellors Krzysztof Szydłowiecki and Albertas Goštautas. The miniature decoration, signed and dated on three folios (fol. 36v, 74v, and 229v), represents an orthodox Catholic model of piety with anti-Reformation accents, similar to the Prayer Book of Sigismund the Old, completed in 1524.

The miniatures were created by multiple artists, which was a common practice for manuscript decoration commissions at the time. The individual illuminators working with Samostrzelnik varied in technical skill and color use. However, some illuminations stand out due to a unique painting technique, described by researchers as "painterly". These miniatures, which also bear the signature S.C. (Stanislaus Claratumbensis), are attributed entirely to Brother Stanisław Samostrzelnik of Mogiła. To achieve visual unity in the Book of Hours of Queen Bona, similar compositional schemes and recurring motifs were introduced.

The color scheme of the miniatures from Samostrzelnik's workshop is vivid and limited to a few primary colors, sometimes lightened. The dominant hues in the palette include shades of blue (ultramarine, cornflower, turquoise), sea green, and olive, as well as pinks appearing alongside alizarin red, carmine, vermilion, and orange. Complementary shades include ashy and violet grays, tawny and dark browns, and white, with yellow used sparingly. Luminescent effects were achieved by combining pigments with powdered gold. This painterly gold was used not only in marginal decorations but also in the main parts of the illuminations, allowing for color harmonization, spatial depth, and a shimmering, radiant surface.

The illuminations in the Prayer Book of Queen Bona reveal influences not only from the woodcuts of Hans von Kulmbach, Albrecht Dürer, and Albrecht Altdorfer – particularly from the Fall and Redemption of Mankind cycle – but also from the paintings of the Danube school. The modifications introduced by Samostrzelnik when copying and reinterpreting other artists' works softened the dramatic nature of the original scenes, giving the miniatures a lyrical quality with elements of fairy-tale wonder and splendor.

Among the prayer books created by the artist, the Book of Hours of Queen Bona stands out for its strong influence of Italian Renaissance ornamentation in the decoration of the borders. This includes Venetian-style arabesques and a clear arrangement of motifs such as candelabras, vases, medallions, laurel wreaths, putti with cornucopias, and dolphins.

Presentation	Leaf	Miniature	Description
Prayer of Christ in Gethsemane	20v		The model for the depiction of Christ praying in Gethsemane was a woodcut by Albrecht Altdorfer from the cycle The Fall and Redemption of Mankind from 1513. A motif characteristic of the Rhenish school, uncommon in the art of other regions, is the depiction of an angel presenting Jesus not with a chalice, but with Arma Christi. The border contains the coat of arms of the Milanese branch of the Sforza family.
Annunciation to the Blessed Virgin Mary	36v		The iconographic model may have been Hans Baldung's Annunciation woodcut from 1514 or one of Albrecht Dürer's Annunciation scenes, but the original composition was significantly reworked. The archangel Gabriel unveiling a curtain over the kneeling Mary and the large window with a view of an extensive landscape are elements borrowed from German prints, while the dense ornament covering the furniture and the window frame is of Italian origin. The iconographic motifs used refer to the concept of the Immaculate Conception of Mary and the interpretation of the Incarnation as the wedding of the Bridegroom (God) with the Bride (the church, personified by Mary) from the Song of Songs. On the kneeler's step, the artist placed his signature and the date of the miniature's execution: S. C. f. A°. MDXXVII (Latin: Stanislaus Claratumbensis fecit Anno 1527). The border features a plant arabesque on a gold background. Among the ornaments, putti in laurel wreaths hold a medallion with the four-part coat of arms of Queen Bona.
Visitation of Saint Elizabeth	48v		The scene of Mary greeting her relative takes place before a portal, where a refined lady in a Renaissance gown and a hat adorned with ostrich feathers stands (possibly a cryptoportrait of Queen Bona). The courtly nature of the scene is further emphasized by a small dog clipped to resemble a lion. The symbolic meaning of the scene relates to the meeting of the church (Mary, the mother of the Savior) with the synagogue (Elizabeth, the mother of the last prophet of the Old Testament). It also contains elements connected to the veneration of Mary, challenged by the Reformation, and the doctrine of the sacrament of baptism. The border, decorated with antique and floral motifs, prominently features the Sforza coat of arms.
Nativity of Jesus (The Adoration of the Child)	60v		The composition of the main scene is based on Albrecht Altdorfer's 1513 woodcut from The Fall and Redemption of Mankind. The modifications introduced by Samostrzelnik emphasized the figure of Mary against the backdrop of the ruined House of David, raised the horizon line, and altered the foreground. The painter highlighted the mystical significance of the scene, emphasizing the dual nature of the Child and the Eucharistic symbolism of his body (Christus immolatus). The main scene, modeled after representations characteristic of the Danube school, is framed in a Renaissance border inspired by Italian works. Among the floral motifs, a crowned shield with the Sforza Serpent stands out, surrounded by a laurel wreath.
Annunciation to the shepherds	65v		In this miniature, whose only source is the Gospel of Luke, nearly a quarter of the scene is occupied by the motif of the opened heavens, from which an angel emerges. The announcement of the news of the Savior's birth is presented as an epiphany, alluding to the revelation of God at Christ's baptism in the Jordan. Among the three figures in the lower part of the miniature, the shepherd playing the bagpipes in the foreground stands out, as he was copied from Dürer's engraving The Bagpiper from 1514. Meanwhile, the three animals in the background derive from Dürer's woodcut The Annunciation to Joachim from between 1503 and 1504. In the marginal decoration, on an intensely red background, a regular pattern of plant vines is applied. Among the floral ornaments appear dolphins, belonging to the repertoire of all'antica motifs, flanking the shield with the Sforza Serpent, as well as birds, including a parrot and an owl.
Adoration of the Magi	70v		The main scene was developed using two woodcuts by Altdorfer. The Adoration of the Magi from the 1513 cycle The Fall and Redemption of Mankind served as a model for the human figures, while the background architecture was taken from The Beheading of Saint John the Baptist from the previous year. Samostrzelnik altered the poses and proportions of the original groups of figures, emphasizing the elegant and exotic figure of Balthazar presenting the Child with a precious goblet and depicting Mary in profile. The gesture of the Child, handing a handful of gold coins to Melchior, symbolically confirms the divine origin of earthly power. The border features a dense motif of sharp, twisted acanthus leaves, similar to ornaments found in Daniel Hopfer's etchings from around 1510. Among the dried vegetation appear kingfishers, symbolizing virginal birth and maternal love, along with several flowers. Two putti flank a laurel-wreathed shield with the Visconti Eagle, an augmentation of arms granted to the Dukes of Milan by the emperor.
Flight into Egypt	74v		A scene with Eucharistic significance, incorporating motifs drawn from apocrypha, mainly the Pseudo-Matthew, is set in a landscape that alludes to Israel's journey through the desert and its salvation. The fruits of the palm tree, which the angels bend toward Mary, symbolize manna and, indirectly, the bread of life, that is, the Eucharist. The Flight into Egypt from the queen's prayer book is almost an exact repetition of Altdorfer's woodcut of the same title.
Purification in the temple	79v		The main depiction is a modified version of Dürer's woodcut The Presentation in the Temple from the 1505 Life of the Virgin cycle, with elements borrowed from Dürer's The Betrothal of the Virgin. The scene encodes a soteriological and Eucharistic message. The Child, wrapped in swaddling clothes resembling a corporal, is lifted above the sacrificial table by Simeon, while Saint Joseph replicates the gesture of a cleric illuminating the host during the elevation by raising a lit candle. In the background, Anna the Prophetess hands the priest the sacrificial doves. The scene is not only a foreshadowing of Jesus' future sacrifice and Mary's co-suffering but also a clear reference to the mystery of the Mass and the offerings presented by the faithful before the altar.
Massacre of the Innocents	87v		The scene of the children being slaughtered takes place before the enthroned Herod the Great, depicted as an Eastern ruler in a fantastical outfit, with a similarly dressed high official at his side. The middle part of the miniature is unusually illuminated, featuring a lone mother raising her hands in despair, while the landscape and Herod's palace are shrouded in shadow. This most dramatic scene, filled with clustered bodies, resembles another miniature by Samostrzelnik on the same theme. Similarly restless, dense compositions are found in German art of the so-called anticlassical style, particularly in the works of Lucas Cranach the Elder, such as The Massacre of the Innocents in Bethlehem from between 1515 and 1516.
Mary with Child	113v		The image of Mary with Child is based on Dürer's 1511 engraving known as Maria with a Pear. Apart from introducing certain modifications and omitting the architectural background, an additional element is the two angels hovering above the crowned Madonna, supporting a second crown. The border, composed of stems, leaves, and flowers in green, white, and blue hues with accents of pink and red, gives the decoration a late Gothic character. The heraldic decoration includes a medallion with the emblem of the Dukes of Milan (a black imperial eagle on a gold background).
King David in prayer (David kneeling before God)	122v		The miniature depicts the ruler considered the author of the penitential psalms – the royal ancestor of Christ and his Old Testament prefiguration. The aged, penitent David, whose harp and cap with a diadem rest on the grass, raises his prayers to God, who leans out from the clouds, dressed in royal robes, crowned, and holding an orb. A similar landscape with a solitary willow is known from Altdorfer's etching from between 1522 and 1523. The border features a late Gothic design of scrolls of leaves and flowers on a gold background.
Purgatory (saving of souls from purgatory by angels)	150v		In painting the rarely depicted scene of angels freeing souls from purgatory, Samostrzelnik drew upon motifs from two works by German artists, both created in 1515 – Hans von Kulmbach's woodcut The Rosary Wreath and Dürer's pen drawing Purgatory in The Prayer Book of Maximilian I. The Holy Trinity in the upper part of the illumination is represented by the Father (the Creator) with the globe, the Holy Spirit (the Teacher), and the Child in Mary's arms. The Virgin Mary, depicted in the Mulier amicta sole type, with an imperial crown over her loose hair and holding a scepter, acts as an intercessor and helper. The message of the miniature, referring to church teachings on temporal punishments for sins and the possibility of freeing souls from purgatorial suffering, has a counter-reformation character. The border decoration consists of dry garlands interwoven with rosettes, among which a human skull is placed – the withered flower buds surrounding it conceal the artist's signature, S C P I (Latin: Stanislaus Claratumbensis Pictor Indignus). Alongside the vanitas motifs, the border features acorns symbolizing moral strength.
Crucifixion of Christ with the Virgin Mary and Saint John	197v		The illumination presents the Virgin Mary and John standing on either side of the cross against a mountainous landscape. The figure of the crucified Christ is surrounded by swirling clouds, separating the heavenly sphere, where he already resides, from the earthly sphere, where his mother and disciple remain. This interpretation introduces an element of theophany into the miniature. The iconographic motifs suggest inspiration not only from the Gospel text but also from popular 14th-century works – Saint Bridget of Sweden's Revelations and the Passion meditations of the Carthusian Ludolph of Saxony's Vita Jesu Christi Domini ac Salvatoris Nostri. In the lower part of the border, a plant ornament entwines the Sforza coat of arms.
Lamentation of Christ after the deposition from the cross	222v		The Lamentation scene depicts Mary embracing her son's body. She is accompanied by two holy women (including Mary Magdalene) in the foreground and John the Evangelist, Nicodemus, and Joseph of Arimathea in the background, with some figures dressed in fashionable Renaissance attire. The scattered instruments of the Passion (Arma Christi) are treated both as objects of particular veneration, popular in the 16th century, and as heraldic emblems, beneath which the Sforza coat of arms, crowned with a royal crown, is set within an elliptical laurel wreath.
Descent of the Holy Spirit	229v		The final miniature in Queen Bona's prayer book differs in character from the other illuminations, referencing the stylistic approach of the Kraków painters' guild through the stylization of figures' garments and the conservative treatment of the theme. The central figure is Mary, around whom 11 apostles are gathered, with two (John and Peter) treated distinctly and seated beside the Virgin. Above their heads, the Holy Spirit in the form of a dove is highlighted by an elliptical, rainbow-colored halo. The border features acanthus leaves and a floral garland. Among the ornaments is a medallion with the emblem of the Dukes of Milan (the Visconti Eagle).

== Provenance ==
The prayer book was likely taken by Queen Bona to Bari in 1556. The manuscript's fate remains unknown until the early 19th century when it was part of the collection of the English bibliophile and antiquarian Francis Douce. After his death in 1834, Queen Bona's prayer book became part of the Bodleian Library's holdings as part of the collector's estate.

== Book edition ==
A facsimile edition of the prayer book was published in 2016 by Wydawnictwo Poznańskie Studia Polonistyczne as part of the Libri Precationum Illuminati Poloniae Veteris series. At the Kraków Book Fair, the series received an award in the "Edycja" competition for editorial excellence.

== Bibliography ==
- Ameisenowa, Zofia (1967). Cztery polskie rękopisy iluminowane z lat 1524-1528 w zbiorach obcych [Four Polish Illuminated Manuscripts from 1524–1528 in Foreign Collections] (in Polish). Kraków: Uniwersytet Jagielloński.
- Borkowska, Urszula (1999). Królewskie modlitewniki. Studium z kultury religijnej epoki Jagiellonów (XV i początek XVI wieku) [Royal Prayer Books. A Study of the Religious Culture of the Jagiellonian Era (15th and Early 16th Century)] (in Polish). Lublin: Towarzystwo Naukowe Katolickiego Uniwersytetu Lubelskiego. ISBN 83-87703-23-0.
- Miodońska, Barbara (1983). Miniatury Stanisława Samostrzelnika [Stanisław Samostrzelnik's Miniatures] (in Polish). Warsaw: Wydawnictwa Artystyczne i Filmowe. ISBN 83-221-0190-2.
