= Mogiła Abbey =

Cistercian monastery in Nowa Huta, Kraków, Poland

Cistercian Abbey of Our Lady of Clara Tumba
- Opactwo Cystersów w Mogile
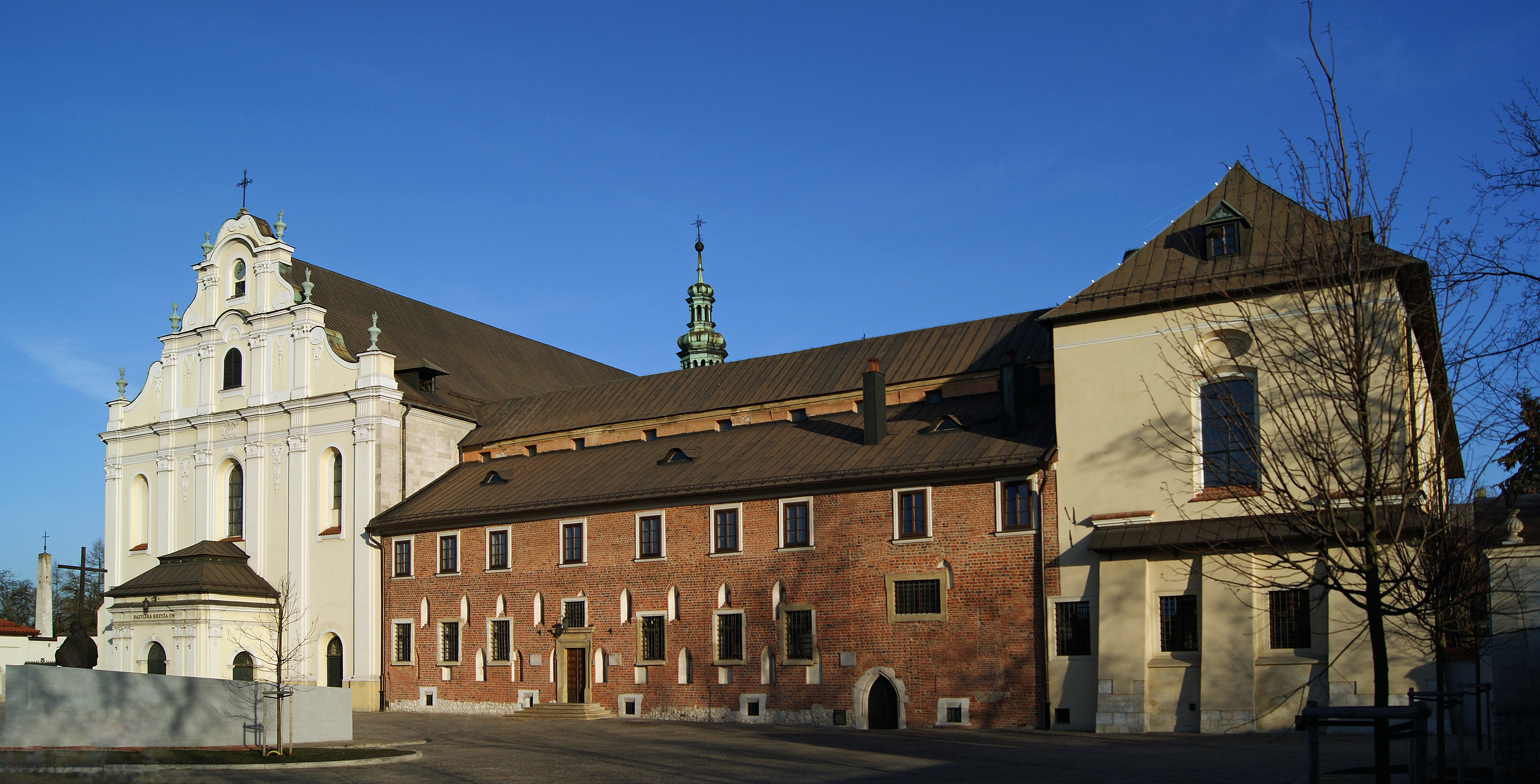
- From the left, the church and the monastery
- Interactive map of Cistercian Abbey of Our Lady of Clara Tumba

Monastery information
- Order: Cistercians
- Established: 1222
- Archdiocese: Kraków

People
- Founder: Bishop Iwo Odrowąż
- Abbot: Piotr Chojnacki, O.Cist.

Architecture
- Style: Polish Gothic and Renaissance
- Completed date: 1225

Site
- Location: ul. Klasztorna 11; Kraków
- Country: Poland
- Coordinates: 50°03′52.2″N 20°03′11.8″E
- Website: www.mogila.cystersi.pl

Designations

Historic Monument of Poland
- Designated: 2023-09-13
- Reference no.: D.U. 2023 poz. 1867

Mogiła Abbey (Polish: Opactwo Cystersów w Mogile; Latin: Abbatia B.M.V. de Clara Tumba) is a Cistercian monastery in the Nowa Huta District of Kraków, Poland. The abbey was founded in 1222 by the Bishop of Kraków, Iwo Odrowąż. The religious complex was built for religious reasons as well as for prestige. It was the largest and most impressive church in medieval Poland after Wawel Cathedral, and served as the Odrowąż family's burial place until the 16th century.

The architectural complex includes the Polish Gothic church of the Assumption of the Blessed Virgin Mary and St. Wenceslaus (Polish: Kościół Wniebowzięcia Najświętszej Maryi Panny i św. Wacława), which serves as the Parish Church of St. Bartholomew the Apostle as well as the abbey church for the monks. There is also the Polish Renaissance-style abbot's palace, built around 1569, as well as the red-brick monastery, with a broad inner courtyard, outbuildings, vegetable garden, greenhouse, etc.

== History ==
Under the reign of Henry I the Bearded, the Duke of Silesia, a community of monks was brought in from Lubiąż Abbey to Mogiła by Odrowąż around 1219, to commence the construction of the brand new church in his diocese. He granted them a village by the Vistula River, close to his residence in the capital. The monastic community, consisting of the 13 professed monks mandatory for an independent monastery, moved in around 1225, although the expansion of the abbey continued for years to come. The Mogiła Abbey was confirmed by the Roman Curia through a papal bull signed by Pope Gregory IX on 9 June 1228. In Latin, the monastery still retains its name of Clara Tumba (Bright Tomb), a name derived from two local toponyms. There is an ancient barrow, called Wanda Mound, within a mile of the monastery site; and the name of the site of the monastery, originally the village of Mogiła, translates as "tomb" in Polish.

In 1241 the abbey was ransacked in the course of the Mongol invasion of Poland. It was rebuilt and the abbey church was consecrated in 1266 by Bishop Jan Prandota. It was later consumed by fire in 1447. It was ravaged again in the 17th century by the invading Swedish army. The abbey was destroyed and its entire resident population was killed by the Swedes, except for two monks whose lives were spared. The structure was renovated numerous times. The Baroque façade of the monastery church was added in 1779–80, based on a design by Franz Moser.

The abbey church was promoted in 1970 by Pope Paul VI to the rank of a minor basilica, and visited by Pope John Paul II, who celebrated Mass for 200,000 people in a nearby open field in 1979.

== Notable individuals ==
Under the reign of Abbot Erazm Ciołek (a relative of the noted scholar, Bishop Erazm Ciołek of Płock), who was elected as abbot in 1522, the abbey was restored to its former glory, with a greatly expanded collection of rare books. He died two years after being appointed the Vicar General of the Archdiocese of Kraków in 1544, and was buried in the abbey cemetery.

This abbot employed the services of the Polish Renaissance painter Stanisław Samostrzelnik, known also as Stanisław z Mogiły (c. 1490–1541), who spent his final years working at the abbey, where he died. His frescoes are featured in the right-hand transept and in one of the chapels of the monastery church, including his painting on the forward wall of the chancel from c. 1530.

== Gallery ==
=== Church ===
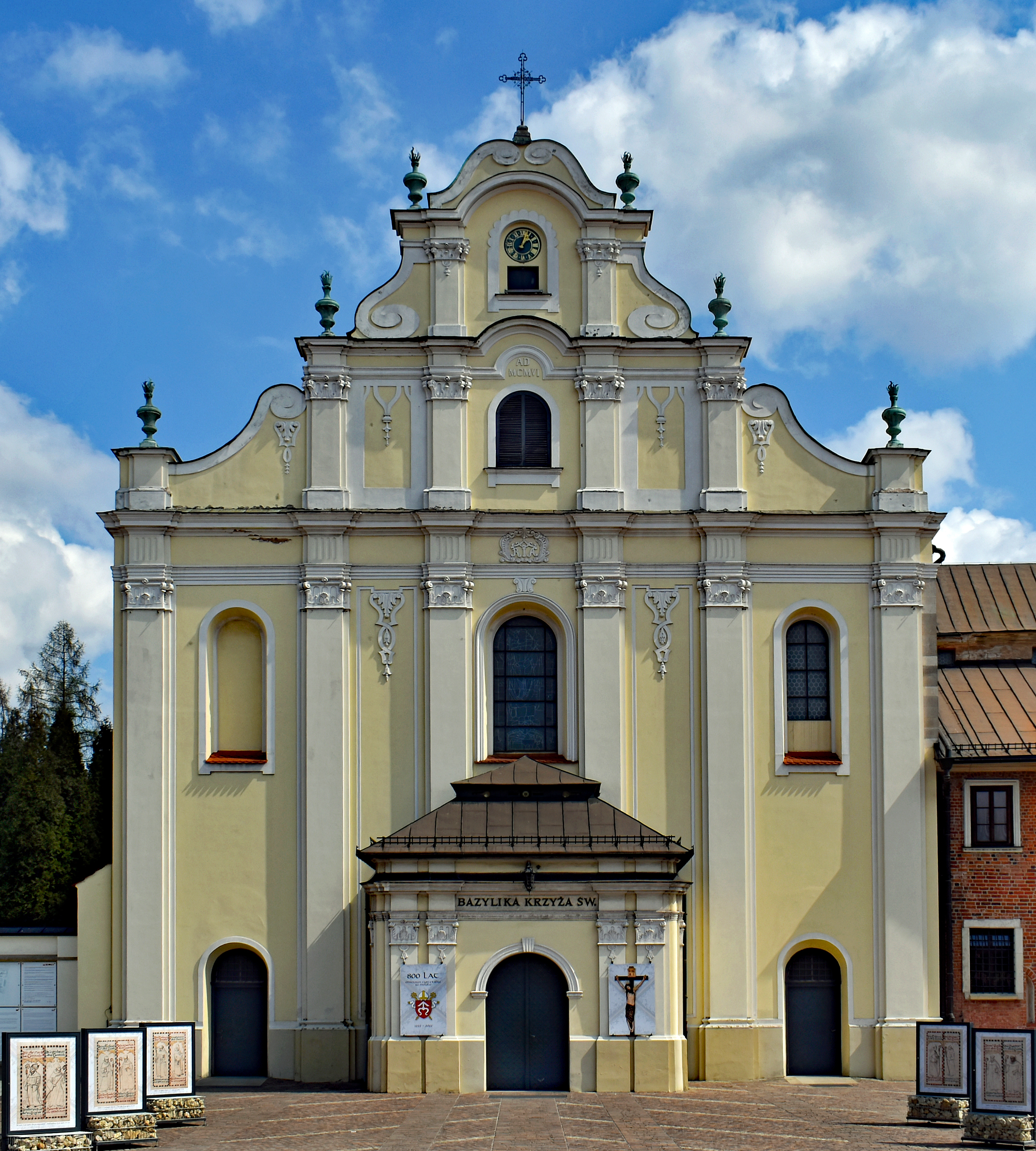
Church of the Assumption of the Blessed Virgin Mary and St. Wenceslaus
Baroque façade

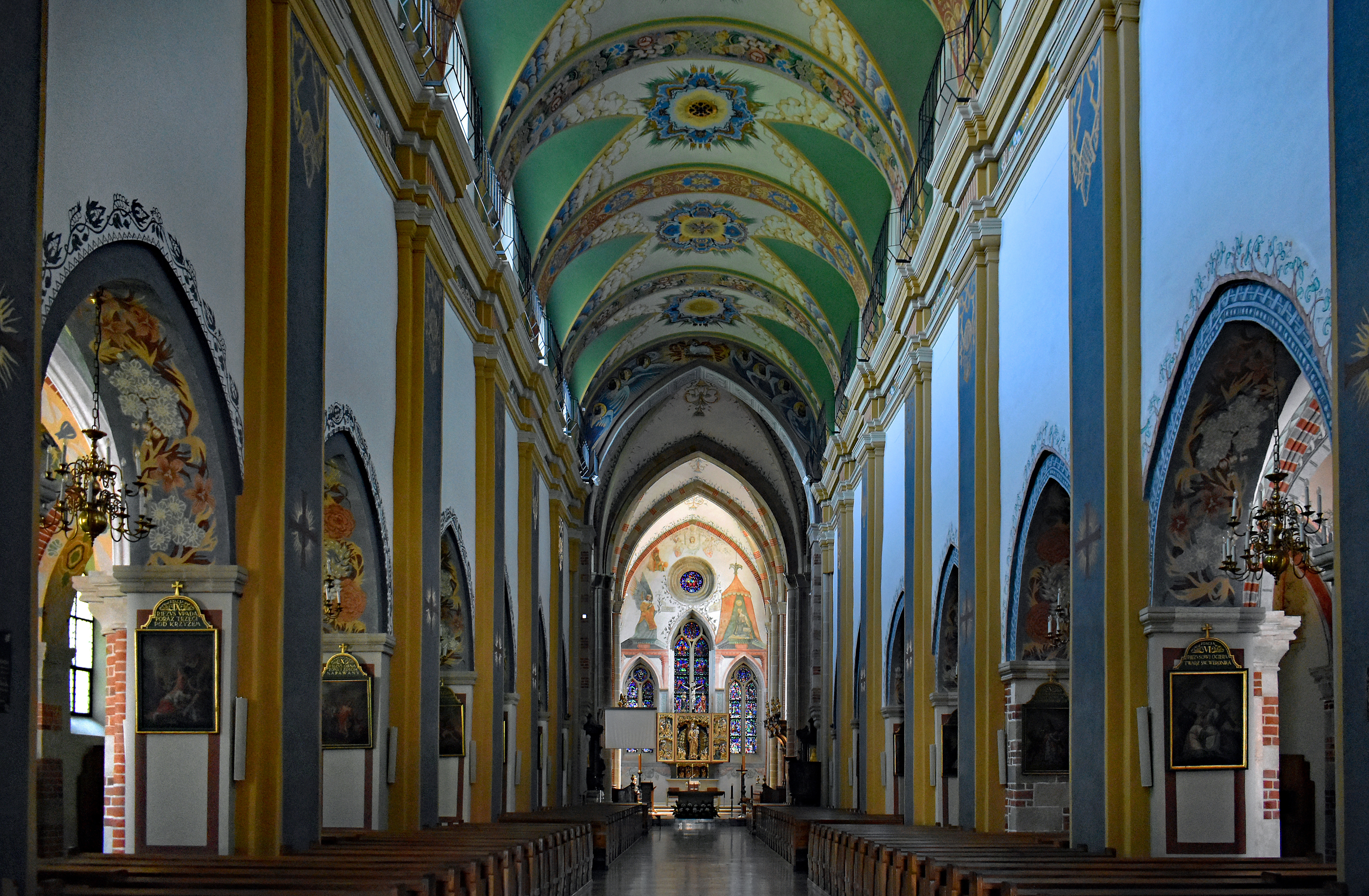
The main nave of the church

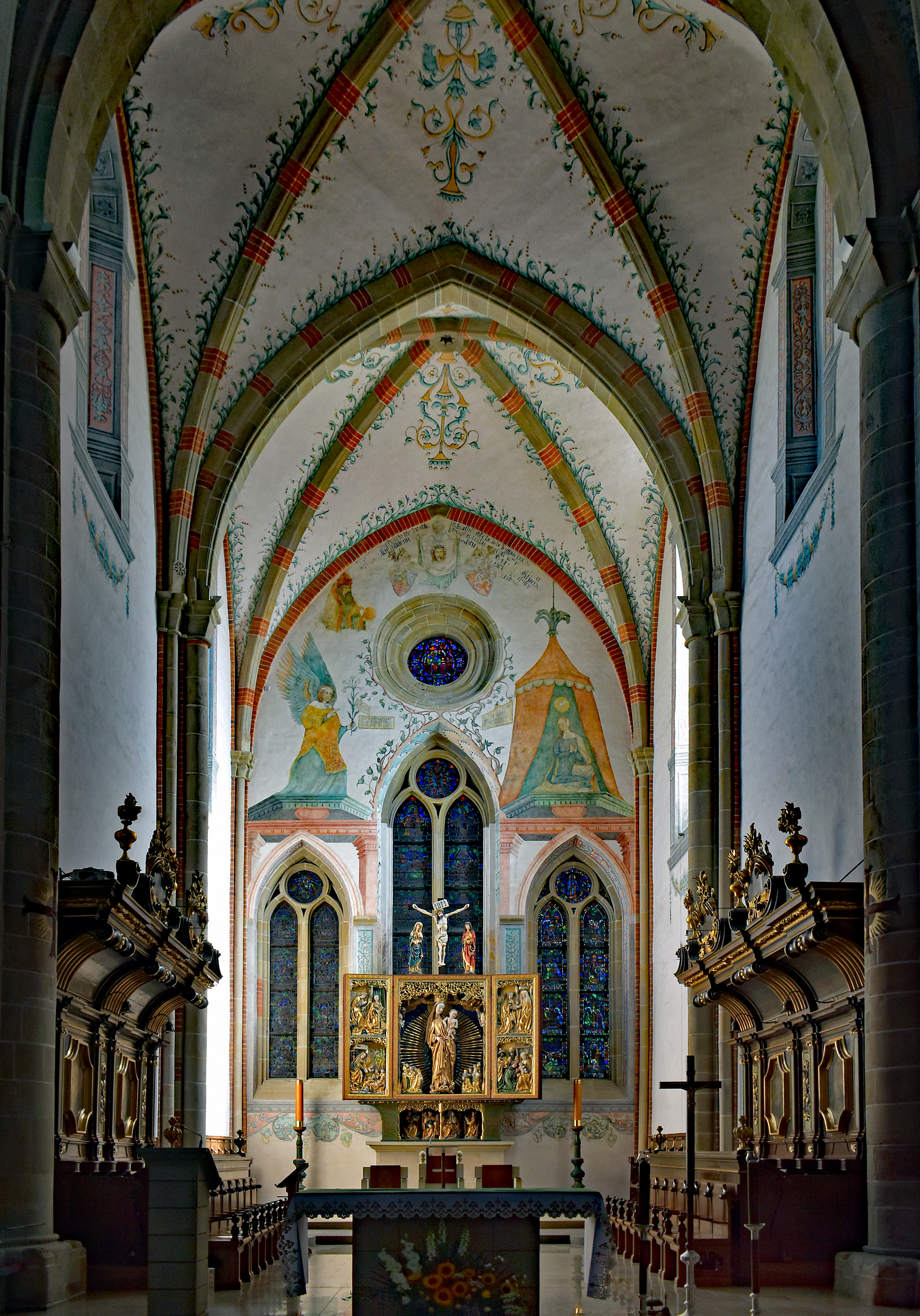
Chancel

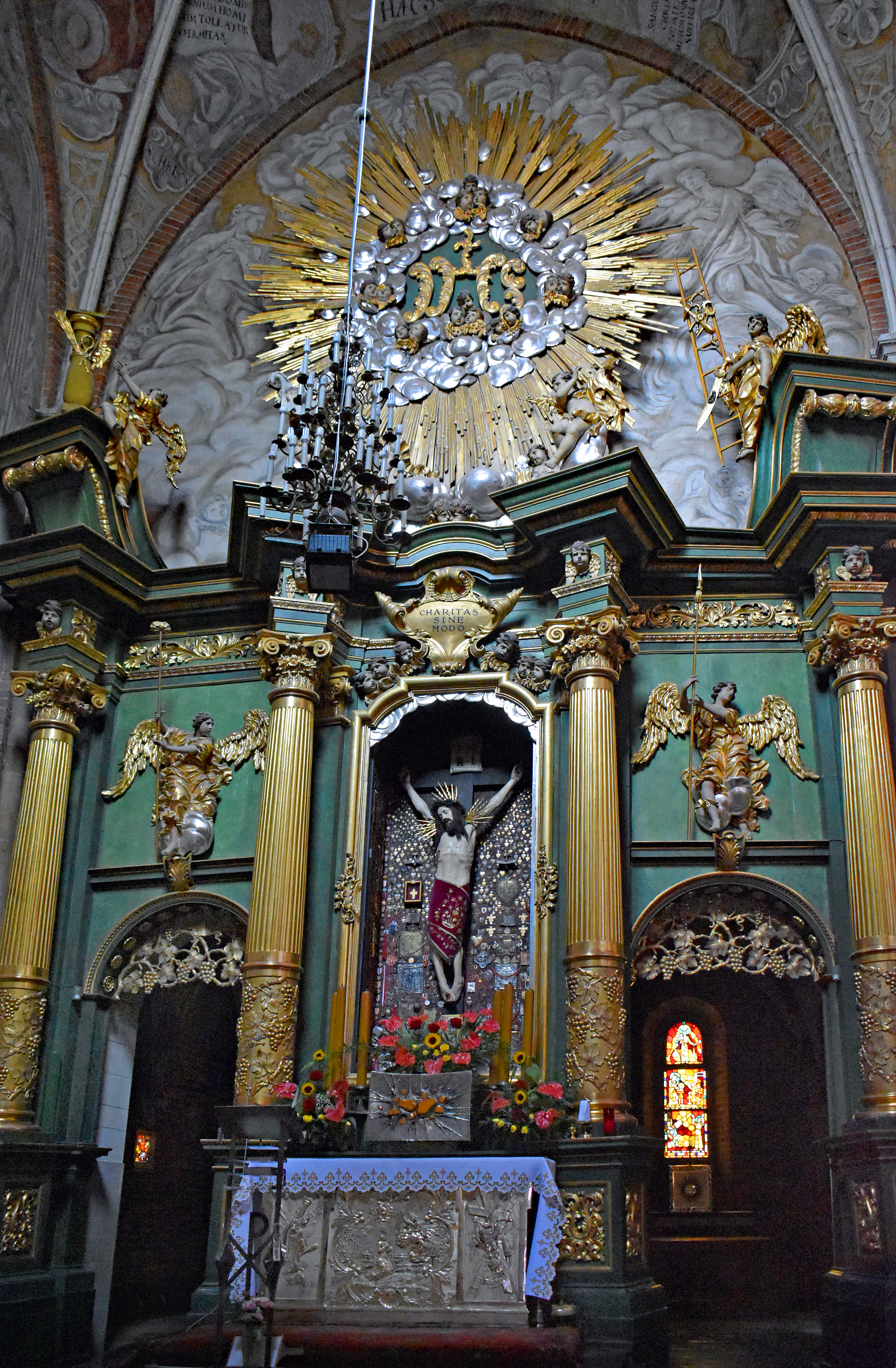
Chapel of the Holy Cross

=== Monastery ===
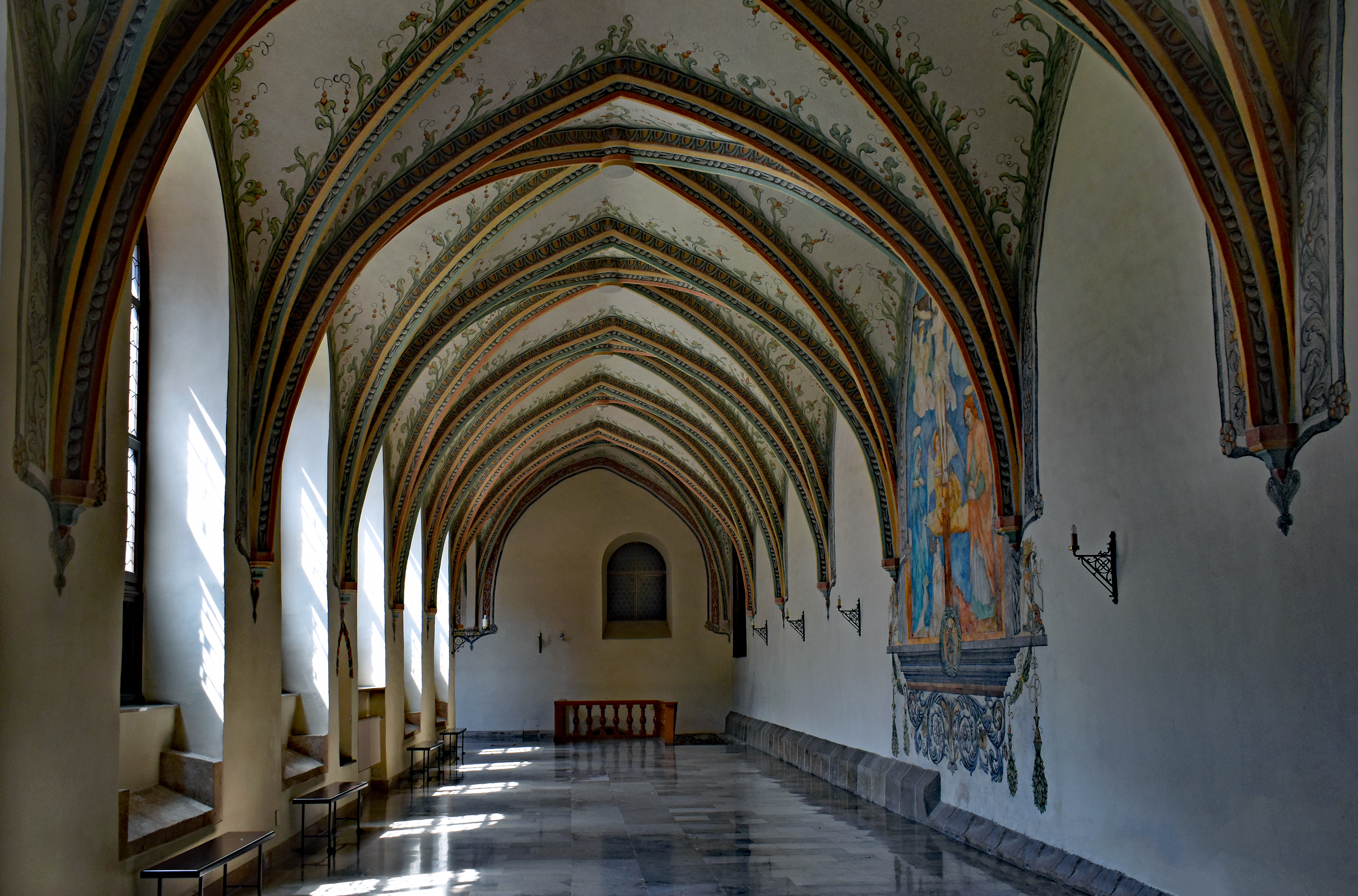
The cloister of the monastery

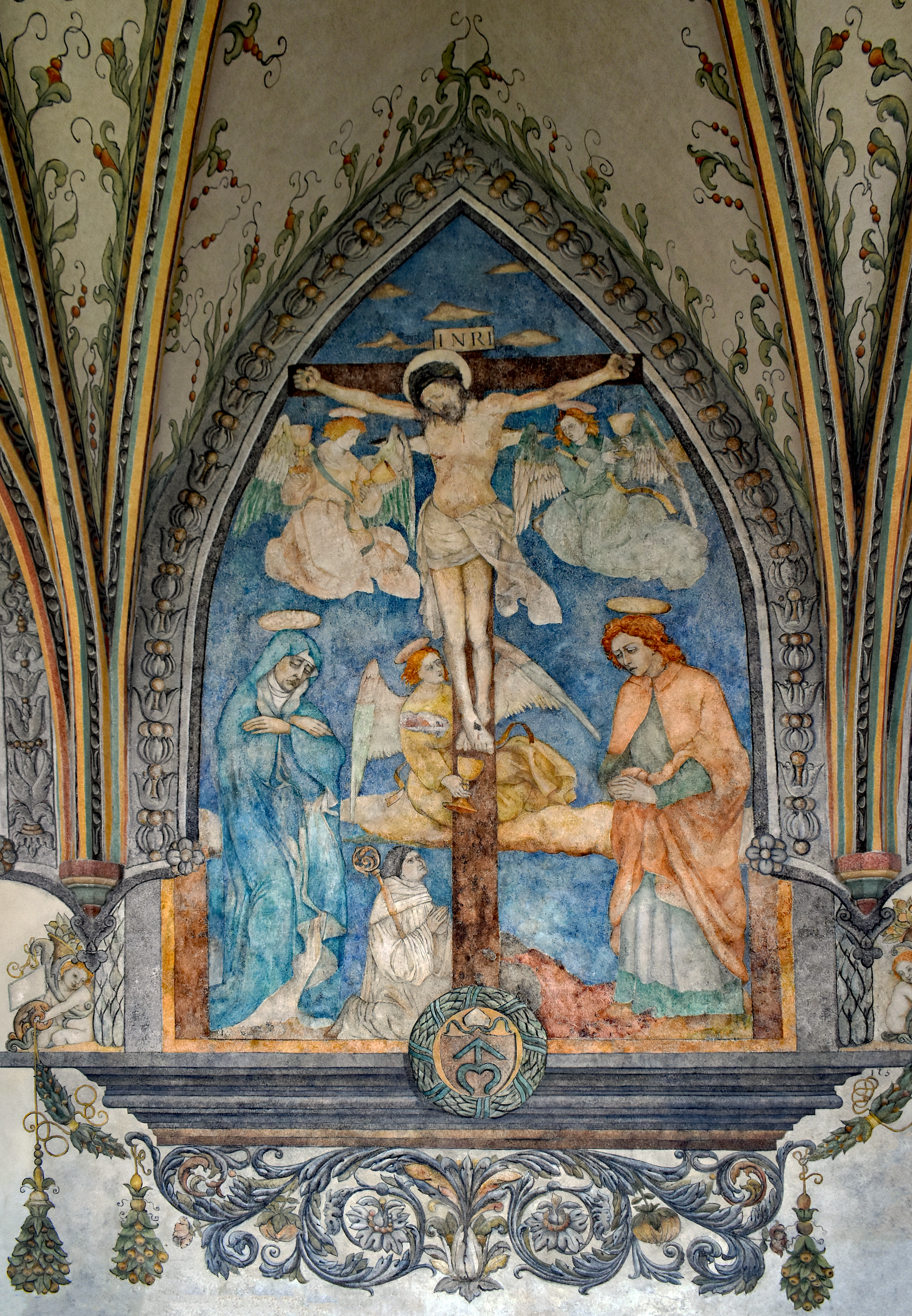
Crucifixion (polychrome, 1530-1541) by Stanisław Samostrzelnik, in the cloisters of the monastery

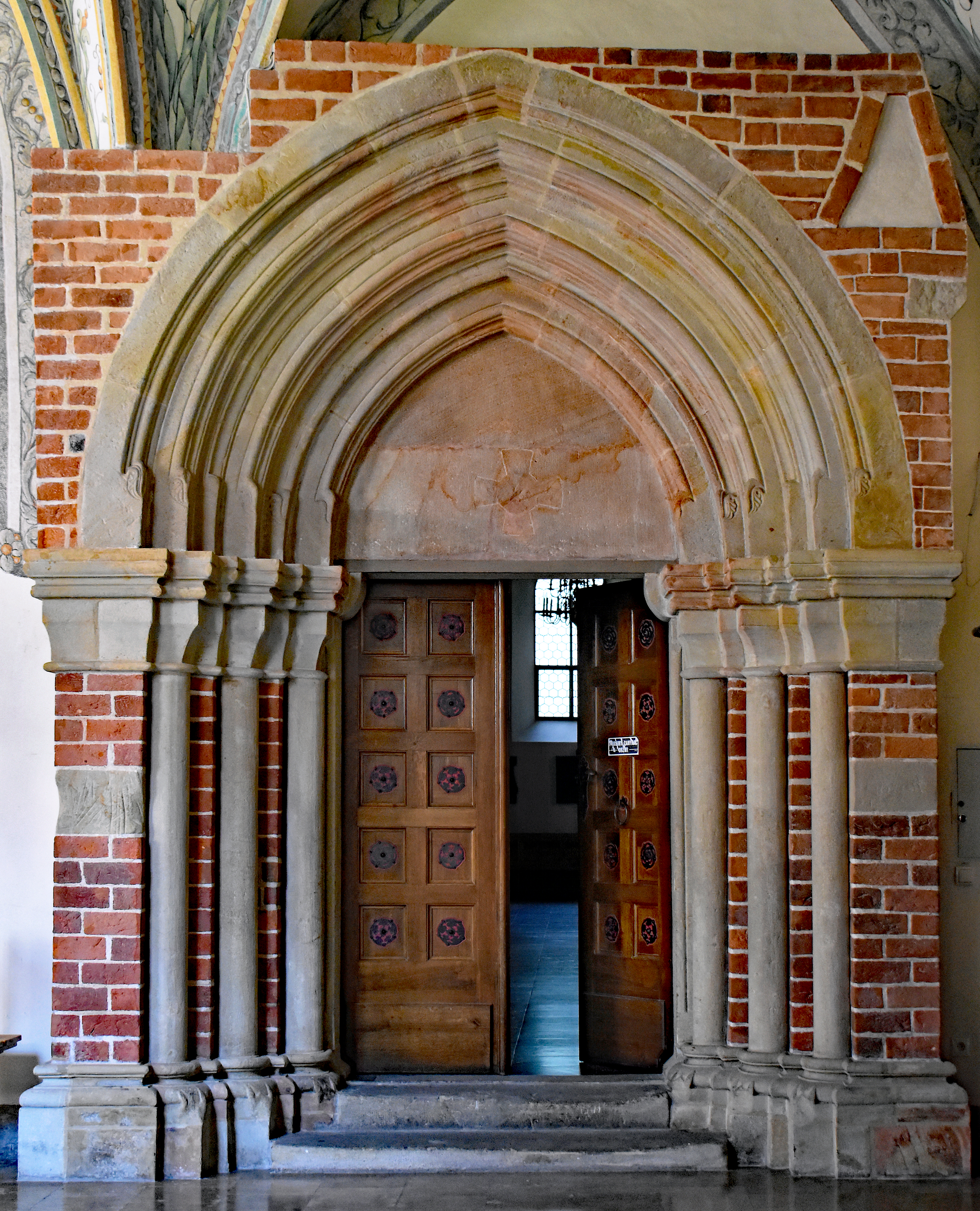
Gothic portal, entrance from the monastery to the church

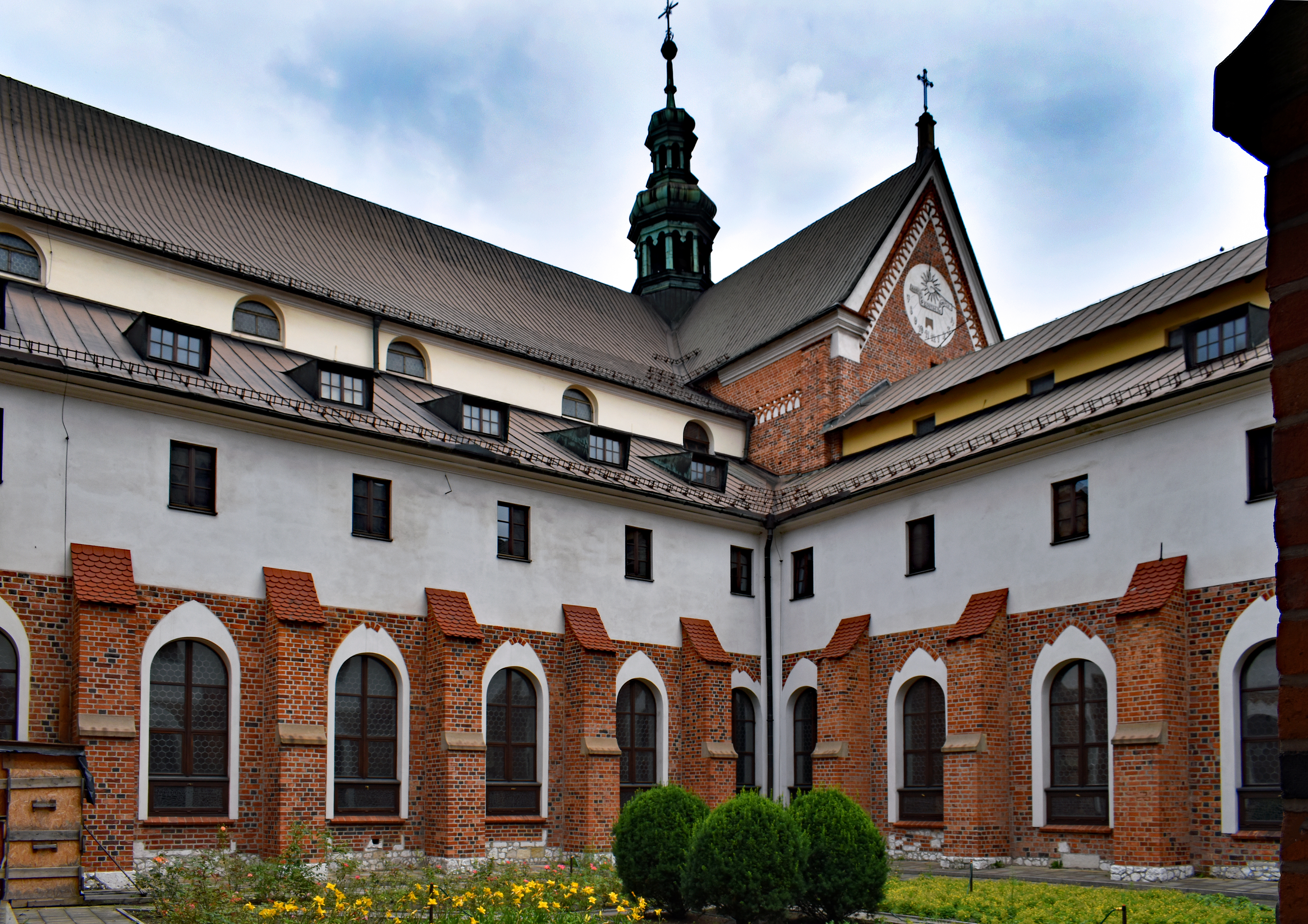
Courtyard

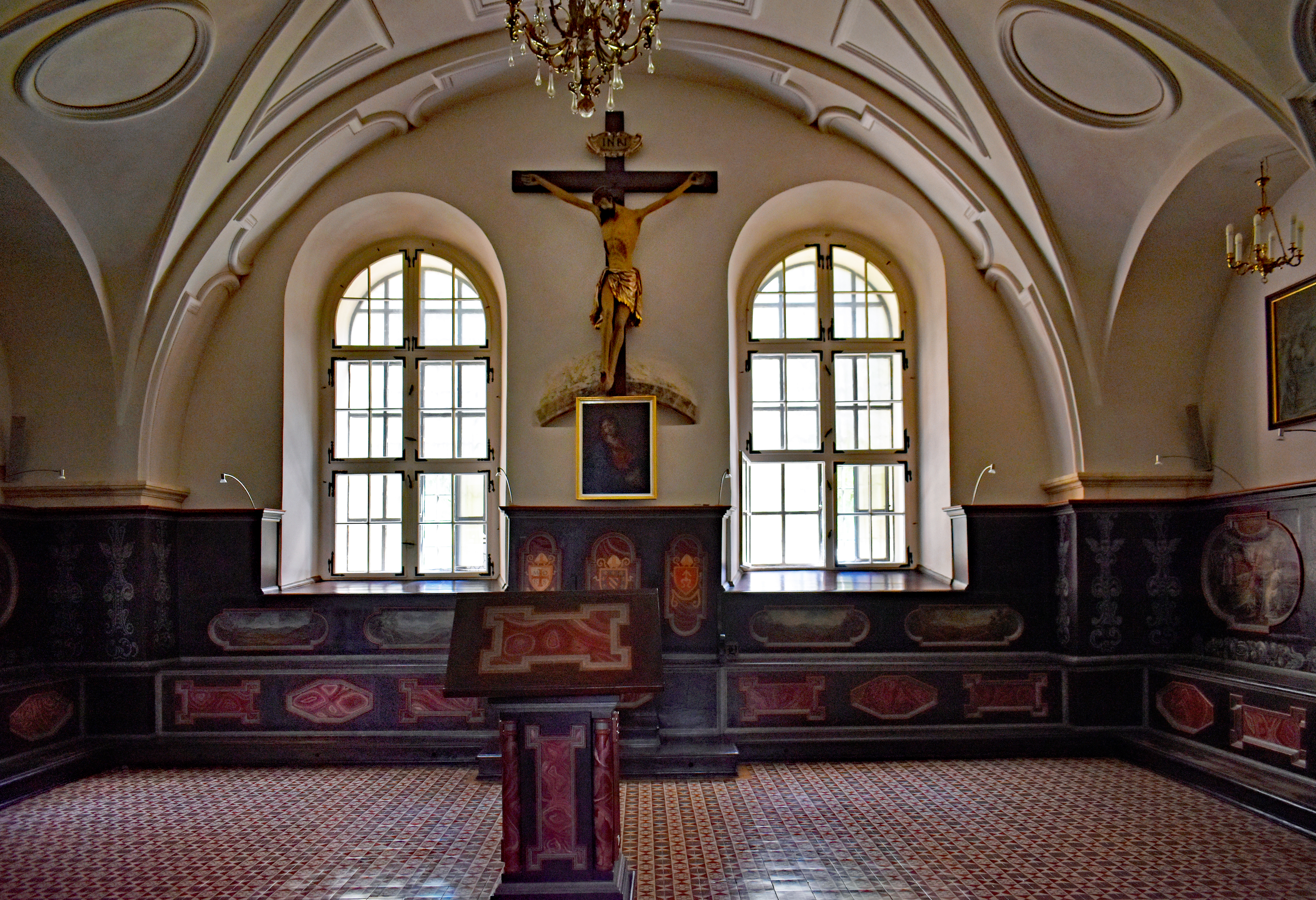
Chapter house interior

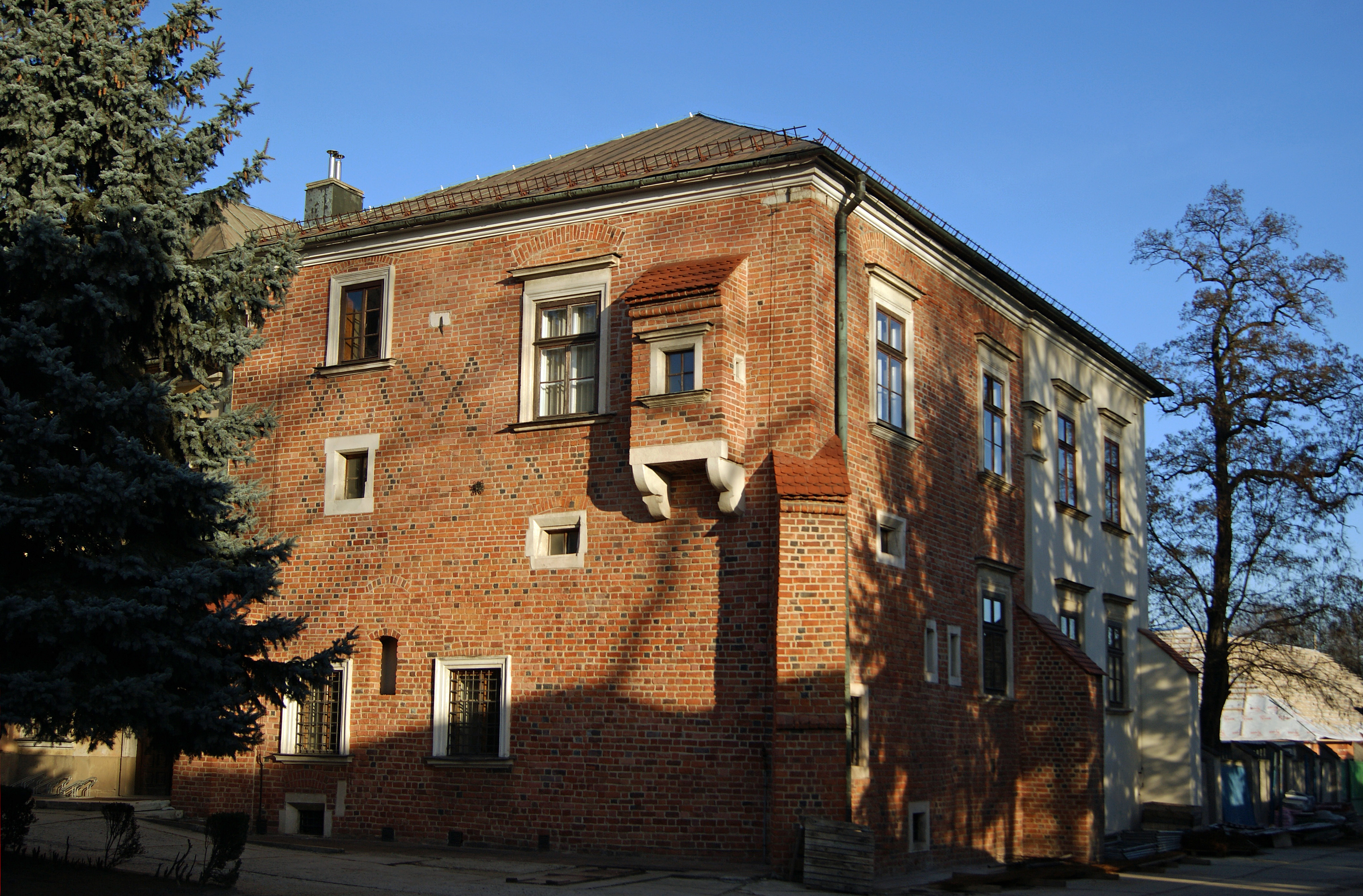
Old abbot's house
