= Stet =

Stet is a Latin word (meaning "let it stand") used in proofreading to indicate that a previously marked change is to be ignored.

Stet or STET may also refer to:

- Stet (novel), a 2006 novel by American author James Chapman
- "Stet" (short story), a 2018 story by Sarah Gailey
- STET, a 2019 studio album by Guy Sigsworth
- Stet (software), a public document commenting software
- STET (text editor), a folding text editor
- STET (fanzine), a science-fiction fanzine
- Securities turnover excise tax, a small tax on every stock, swap, derivative, or other trade on financial markets
- STET Homeland Security Services, a security consultancy firm based in Singapore
- STET – Società Finanziaria Telefonica, an Italian telecommunications company, today merged with Telecom Italia
- Stet, Missouri, an unincorporated community in the United States
- Stet: a memoir, a 2000 book by Diana Athill
- STET-CORE, a French interbank automated clearing-house system

== Persons with the given name ==
- Stet Howland (born 1960), American drummer

== See also ==
- Stetter
