= Nass Corporation =

Bahraini industrial and construction services conglomerate

Nass Corporation B.S.C.
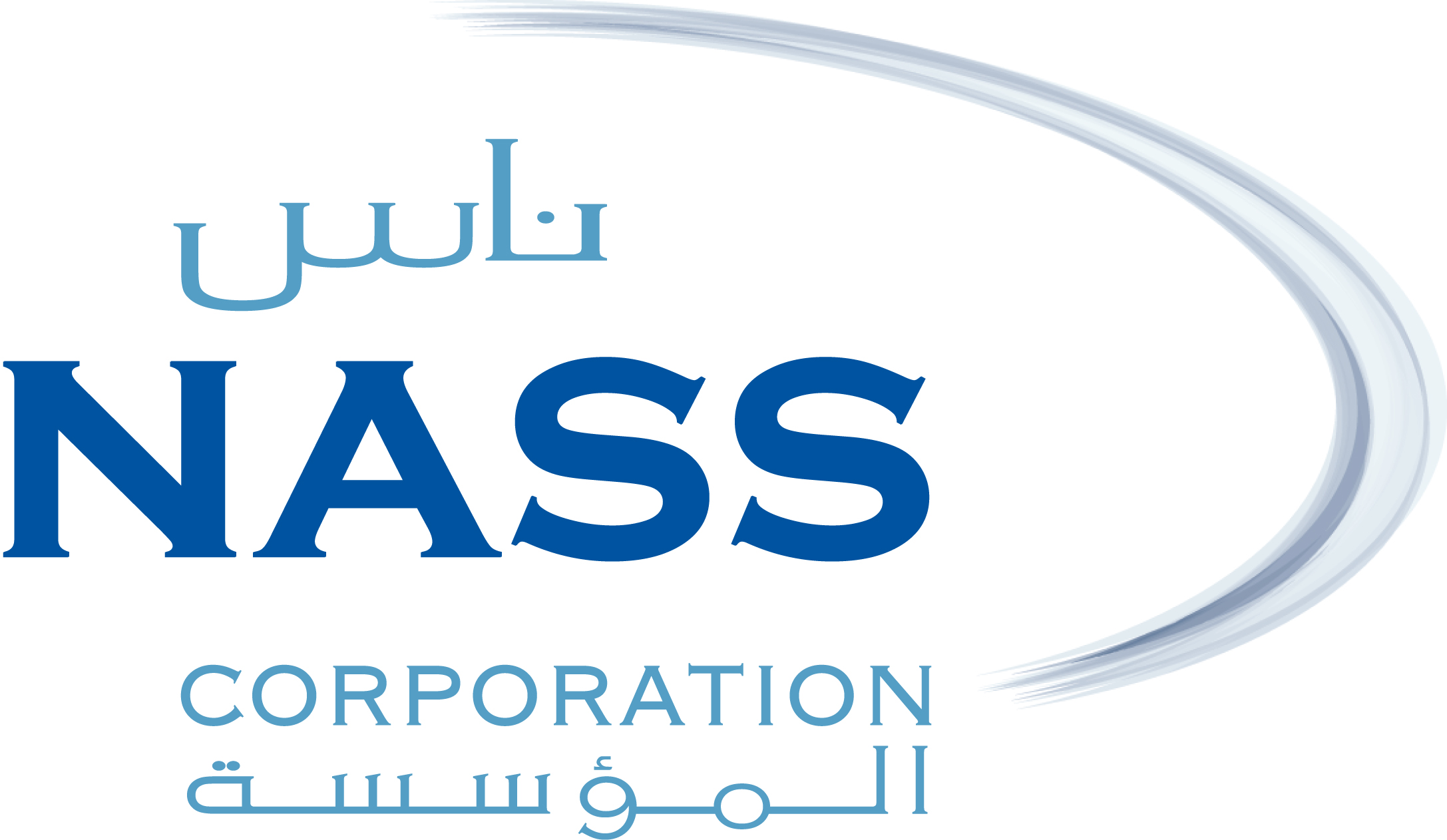
- Company type: Public
- Industry: Construction, Engineering, Dredging, Scaffolding, Equipment, Sand, Concrete, Food, Industrial Services, Asphalt, Water, Ice, Landscaping
- Founded: 1963
- Founder: Abdulla Ahmed Nass
- Headquarters: Mina Salman, Manama, Kingdom of Bahrain
- Area served: Middle East
- Key people: Sameer Abdulla Nass, (Chairman), Sami Abdulla Nass (Vice Chairman and Managing Director)
- Revenue: BHD 182,000,000 (2018)
- Number of employees: 4,000 (2017)
- Website: www.nasscorporation.com

Nass Corporation B.S.C. is a Bahraini public joint-stock company established and listed on the Bahrain Stock Exchange since the year 2005. The paid-up capital is currently BHD 22 million.

Nass Corporation has worked on many of Bahrain's major projects, and the company's corporate headquarters are in the Kingdom of Bahrain, with operations in Saudi Arabia and the United Arab Emirates.

== Divisions and subsidiaries ==
Nass Corporation consists of Seven Divisions and Five Subsidiaries (three wholly owned and two partly owned).

Nass Industrial Services (NIS)

One of the emerging Engineering, Procurement and Construction (EPC) company in the Persian Gulf region through strategic technology and engineering tie-ups. The division is engaged in EPC of Packaged Unit, General Plant Construction, Heavy Engineering & Process Equipment manufacturing, Operation & Maintenance, Refractory & Insulation, Industrial Painting projects in the Kingdom as well as in other GCC Countries. NIS was registered in 1978.www.nasscorporation.com,

Nass Scafform Contracting

One of the leading scaffolding and formworks companies in the Persian Gulf region, concentrating mainly on the energy and petrochemical sector, the company has undertaken many projects for international and regional clients. It has offices in Bahrain, Saudi Arabia and Qatar.

Nass Sand Processing Plant (NSPP)

NSPP was formed in 1977 to supply washed building sand to Bahrain's construction industry. Currently, NSPP has a production capacity of over 2,000 tons per day.

Nass Commercial Services

Nass Commercial started operations in the early 1960s as a support function for the Nass Group. In 1986, Nass Commercial Services became a separate division. The division represents several international manufacturers and provides sales, distribution, spare parts, and service facilities to the company and other entities outside the company. The main brands are: Schwing, Stetter, ESAB, Hangcha, and Nass Commercial.

Nass Ice Plant

Nass Ice Plant owns a reverse osmosis plant with a capacity to produce over 200,000 gallons of sweet water each day and two ice plants with a production capacity of about 85 tons of ice per day, for use by industrial establishments, hotels, restaurants, and supermarkets.

Nass Foods

Established in the year 1982 as an independent trading division of Nass Group. The division operates on multi levels as an importer, wholesaler, retailer, supplier to retail markets, franchisers and caterers both frozen and dry food products. It handles a whole range of items including frozen and chilled beef, lamb, poultry, fish, rice, oil, dairy products, spices, pulses and lentils imported from USA, New Zealand, Europe, Brazil, Australia, Singapore, Pakistan and India.

Nass Dredging Company

Established in 2017, NDC is renowned as the first wholly owned Bahraini Dredging Company, specialized in Offshore Reclamation, Dredging Marine Sand, Renting of Barges, Tug boats or ships, Quarrying of stone, sand/clay, etc.. The company owns and operates from two fully equipped jetties, Vessel Al Qadisiya operates from a 14,500m2 facility in Hidd and Vessel - NDC Aqua operates from a 5,200m2 facility in RasZuwaid. The jetties are compliant with all Ministerial and HSE requirements and managed in line with International Maritime Organisation.

=== Wholly owned subsidiaries ===
Nass Contracting Co. W.L.L.

The company was registered with the Ministry of Commerce, Kingdom of Bahrain in 1986, and over the years has undertaken numerous projects of national importance for both public and private sector. The scope of activities includes civil engineering works for commercial and residential buildings, construction of industrial plants, sewerage system, drainage schemes and pipelines, land reclamation and off-shore works such as piling, jetty construction and dredging.

Nass Contracting Co. W.L.L. consists of the following three divisions:

1. Nass Asphalt
2. Nass Landscapes
3. Nass Plumbing

Nass Electrical Contracting Co. W.L.L.

Established in 1981, the company is registered as Class 1 License holder with Bahrain's Electricity Directorate. A comprehensive service is provided from design and supply to installation and commissioning, for a wide variety of electrical and instrumentation contracting with the primary focus on energy and construction sectors.

=== Partly owned subsidiaries ===
Delmon Ready Mixed Concrete and Products Co. W.L.L. (DRMC)

Established in 1973 by Abdulla Ahmed Nass as Bahrain's first producer of concrete. As the leading Readymix concrete company in Bahrain, Delmon has played a major part in the construction of modern Bahrain with well over 7 million cubic meters of quality concrete produced to date. This company operates nine batching plants with the combined capacity to produce around 800 cubic meters of concrete per hour.

Delmon Precast Co. W.L.L. (DPC)

Established in 1984 as a separate company within the Nass Group. Delmon Precast has built a special niche for itself in the Bahrain precast market and become a major manufacturer of high-quality custom-made products for Civil Engineering and building applications. The company's extensive range of products include decorative architectural panels in precast concrete and GRC, heavy-duty reinforced concrete products, pre-stressed long span double T units, bridge beams, hollow core slabs, reinforced concrete pipes, precast walls, septic tanks, precast cladding panels, manholes, foundation bases and various small products such as kerbs and paving slabs.
