= Master of the Stauffenberg Altarpiece =

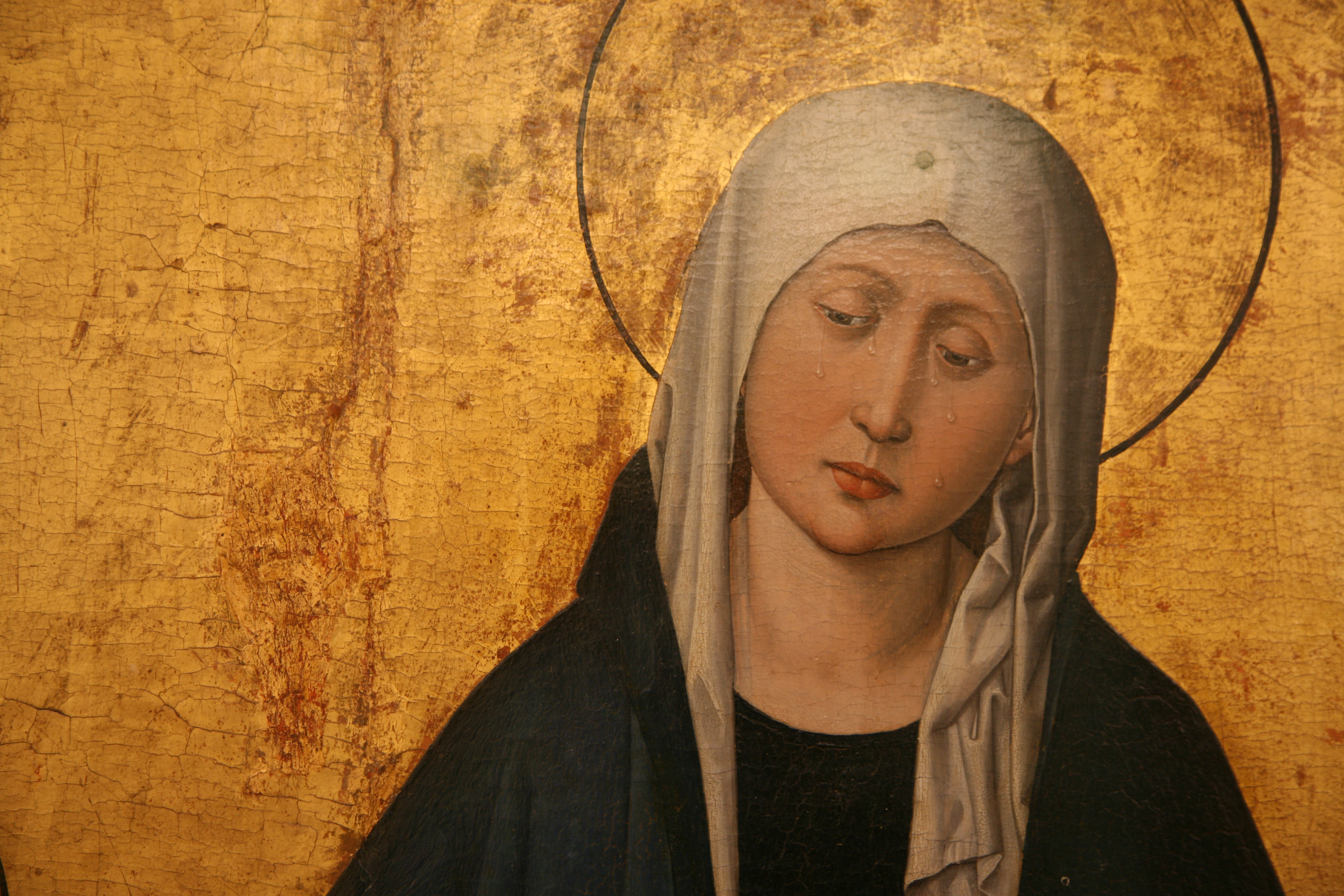
Detail of the Stauffenberg Altarpiece – Sorrow of Mary

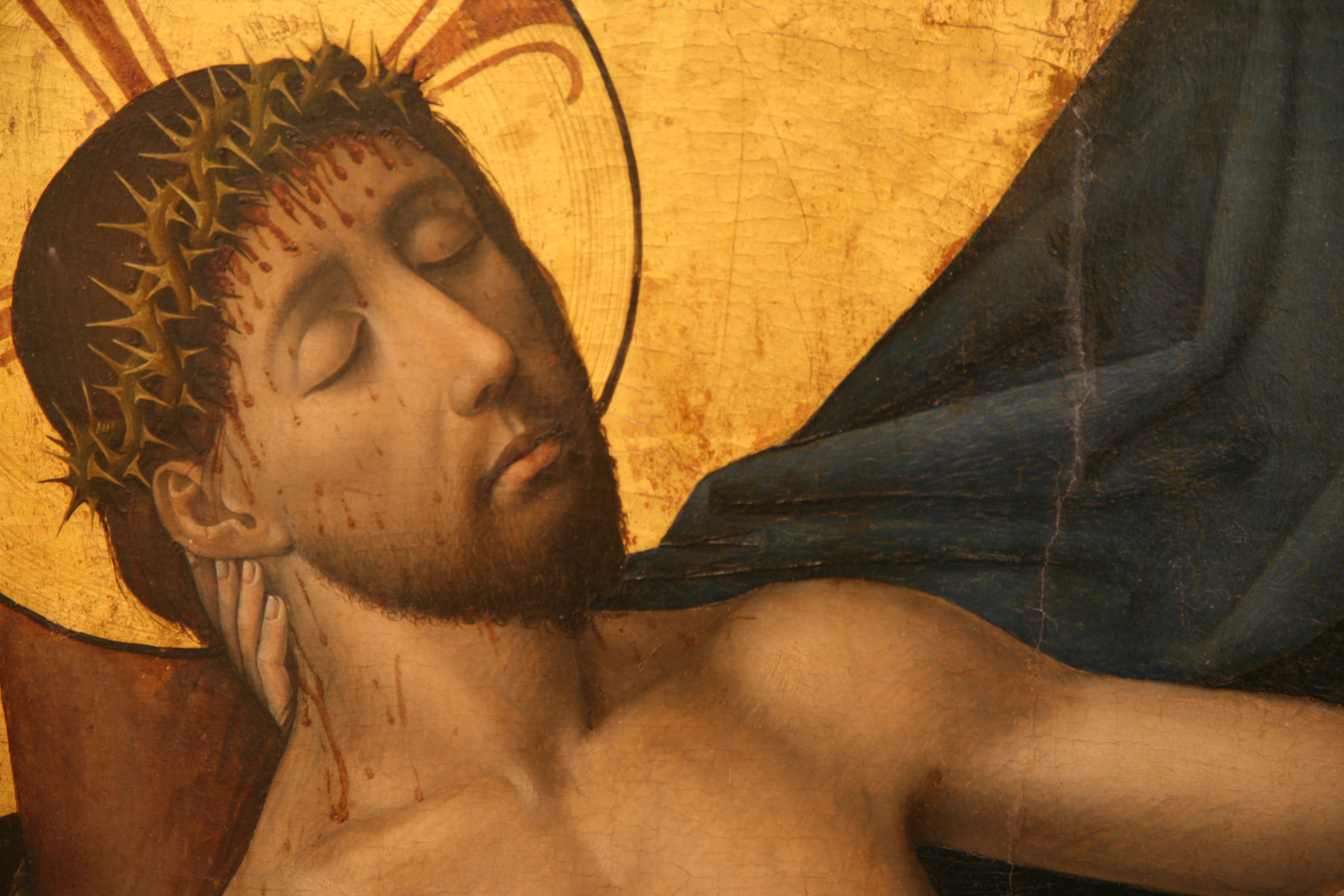
Detail of the Stauffenberg Altarpiece – Dead Christ

The Master of the Stauffenberg Altarpiece (French: Maître du retable de Stauffenberg) is a 15th-century Anonymous Master from Alsace or nearby who was stylistically influenced by Rogier van der Weyden.

His name derives from a triptych kept in the Unterlinden Museum, Colmar, since its creation. The altarpiece was painted between 1454 and 1460 at the behest of Hans Erhard Bock von Stauffenberg, the bailiff of Rouffach, and his wife Aennelin of Oberkirch, 1454 being the year of the couple's marriage and 1460 being the year in which Aennelin is first documented as a widow. The two donors are depicted on the outer panels next to a Crucifixion and have been identified by their coats of arms.

When opened the Stauffenberg altarpiece shows, from left to right, the Annunciation, the Descent from the Cross and the Nativity — two joys of Mary framing one of her sorrows. It was kept in the Monastery of St. Anthony in Isenheim near Colmar for which Matthias Grünewald subsequently painted his Isenheim Altarpiece.

== Sources ==
- Le Musée Unterlinden de Colmar, Sylvie Lecoq-Ramond & Pantxika Béguerie, Éditions Albin Michel, Paris, 1991. ISBN 2-226-05411-1 (p. 43)
