= The Valley of the Creuse, Sunset =

Painting by Claude Monet

- French: La Vallée de la Creuse, soleil couchant
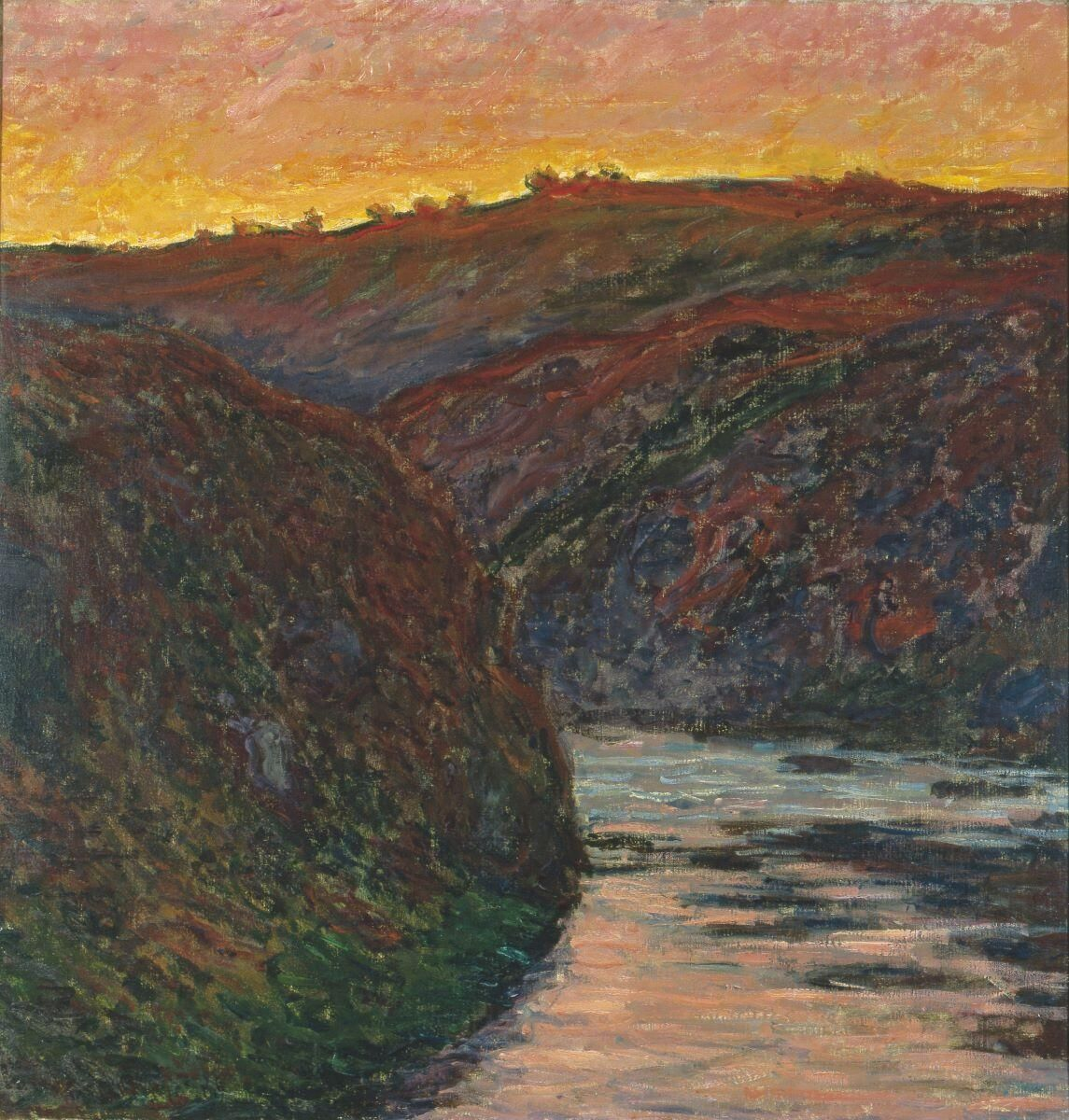
- Artist: Claude Monet
- Year: 1889
- Catalogue: 1226
- Medium: oil paint on canvas
- Movement: Impressionism; Landscape painting
- Subject: French river Creuse running through a valley, at sunset
- Dimensions: 73 cm × 70.5 cm (29 in × 27.8 in)
- Location: Unterlinden Museum, Colmar
- Accession: 1975

The Valley of the Creuse, Sunset is an 1889 oil painting by the French artist Claude Monet, today in the collection of the Unterlinden Museum in Colmar, Alsace (inventory number 88.RP.371). It depicts the river Creuse at sunset in a landscape near Fresselines, where the poet Maurice Rollinat had a house in which Monet was a guest from March to May 1889. During that time, Monet painted fourteen views of the site where the Petite Creuse flows into the Grande Creuse, including the Colmar painting. They were all shown together in an exhibition in Paris in June 1889. The Colmar painting was bought in 1975 from Wildenstein & Company by the Société Schongauer, which administrates the museum since its foundation.

== See also ==
- List of paintings by Claude Monet
