= Raoul Dufy =

French painter (1877–1953)

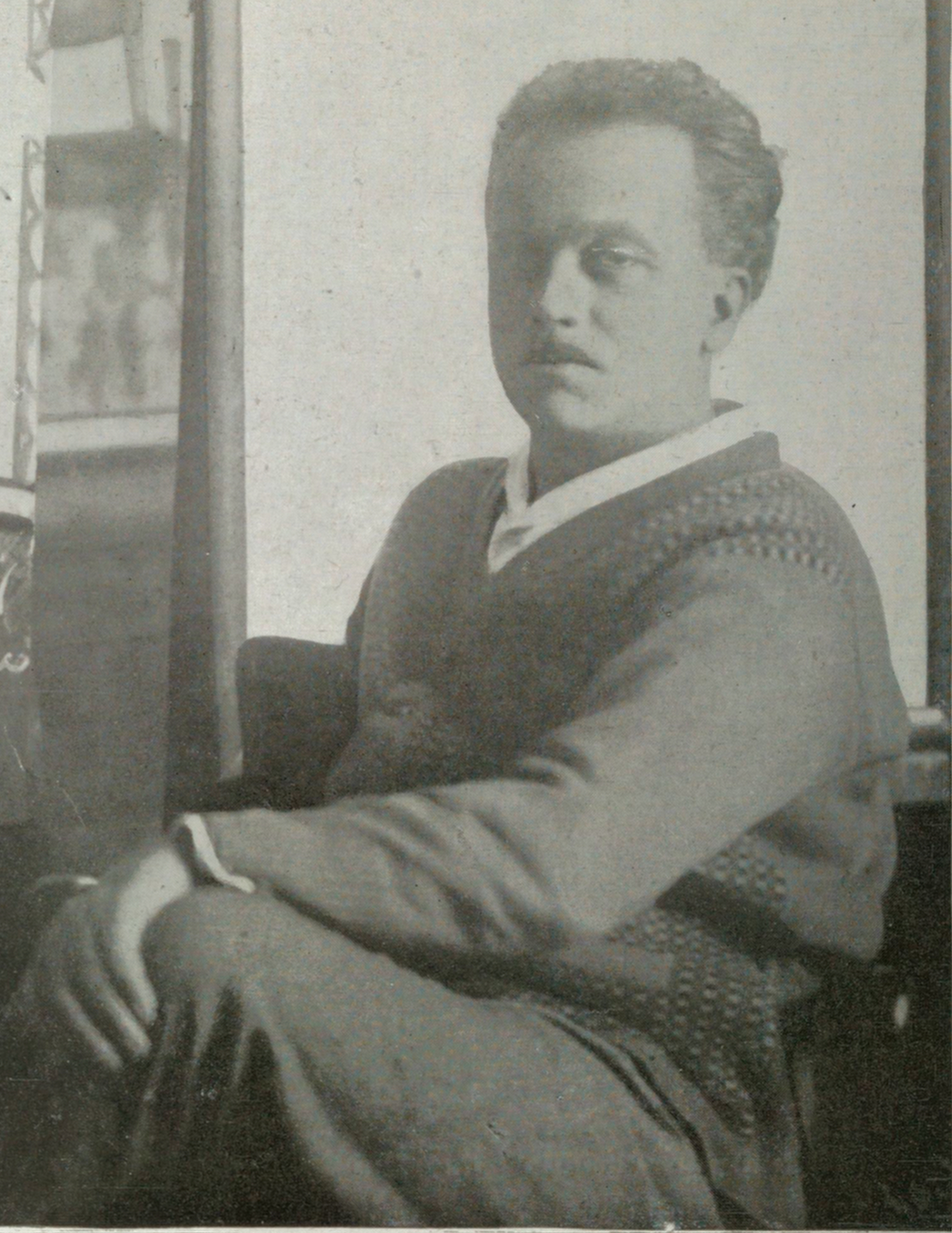
- Raoul Dufy, before 1927
- Born: 3 June 1877; Le Havre, France
- Died: 23 March 1953 (aged 75); Forcalquier, France
- Education: École nationale supérieure des Beaux-Arts
- Known for: Painting, drawing, design, printmaking
- Notable work: La Fée Electricité (1937)
- Movement: Fauvism, Impressionism, modernism, Cubism

Raoul Dufy (French pronunciation: [ʁaul dyfi]; 3 June 1877 – 23 March 1953) was a French painter associated with the Fauvist movement. He gained recognition for his vibrant and decorative style, which became popular in various forms, such as textile designs, and public building decorations. Dufy is most remembered for his artwork depicting outdoor social gatherings. In addition to painting, he was skilled in various other fields, including drawing, printmaking, book illustration, scenic design, furniture design, and planning public spaces.

== Biography ==
=== Early life ===
Dufy was born 3 June 1877 in Le Havre, Normandy, the second of eleven children, to Léon Marius Dufy, an accountant in a steel manufacturing company and talented musician, and Marie Eugénie Ida Dufy (née Lemonnier), originally from Honfleur, Normandy. Among his siblings was Jean Dufy, who would also become an artist later in life.

At age 14, Dufy left school to work for a coffee-importing company. In 1895, at age 18, he began taking evening art classes at Le Havre's École des Beaux-Arts, taught by Charles Lhuillier, a former student of the French portrait painter Ingres. There he met Raimond Lecourt and Othon Friesz, with whom he later shared a studio in Montmartre and maintained a lifelong friendship. During this period, Dufy primarily painted Norman landscapes in watercolors.

In 1900, after a year of military service, Dufy won a scholarship to the École Nationale supérieure des Beaux-Arts in Paris, where he again crossed paths with Othon Friesz (who was also there when Georges Braque was studying). Dufy focused on improving his drawing skills, influenced by impressionist landscape painters such as Claude Monet and Camille Pissarro. His first exhibition was in 1901, at the Exhibition of French Artists. Dufy was introduced to Berthe Weill in 1902 and showed his work in her gallery. He exhibited again in 1903, at the Salon des Indépendants. His work gained some notable recognition when artist Maurice Denis bought one of his paintings. Dufy continued to paint, often in the vicinity of Le Havre, particularly on the beach at Sainte-Adresse, made famous by its association with artists Eugène Boudin and Claude Monet. In 1904, he worked in Fécamp, on the English Channel (La Manche), with his friend Albert Marquet.

=== Later years ===
Henri Matisse's Luxe, Calme et Volupté, which Dufy saw at the Salon des Independents in 1905, directed his interests towards Fauvism. Les Fauves (the wild beasts) emphasized bright color and bold contours in their work. Dufy's painting reflected this aesthetic until about 1909 when contact with the work of Paul Cézanne led him to adopt a subtler technique. However, it was not until 1920, after he had dabbled in another style, Cubism, that Dufy developed his own distinctive approach. This distinctive style encompassed the arrangement of skeletal structures using foreshortened perspective, coupled with the application of rapid, thin color washes. This method later became recognized as stenographic. In his oils and watercolors, he frequently depicted contemporary scenes, including yachting events, elegant social gatherings, and views of the French Riviera. For the 1937 Exposition Internationale in Paris, Dufy produced "La Fée Electricité," one of the largest paintings of its time, an expansive and widely acclaimed work celebrating electricity, executed in oil on plywood.

Dufy also acquired a reputation as an illustrator and commercial artist. He painted murals for public buildings and produced a significant number of tapestries and ceramic designs. His plates appear in books by Guillaume Apollinaire, Stéphane Mallarmé and André Gide. In 1909, Dufy was commissioned by Paul Poiret to design stationery for the house. After 1912, he designed textile patterns for Bianchini-Ferier, which were used for garments worn by Poiret and Charvet. The Bois de Boulogne is a dress that was designed by Paul Poiret, textile design by Dufy, and textile manufactured by Bianchini-Ferier. Dufy had a bold and graphic design approach that reflected Paul Poirets' personal preference and style. Both, Poiret and Dufy, would come together many times to create many new designs.

In the late 1940s and early 1950s, Dufy exhibited at the annual Salon des Tuileries in Paris. By 1950, his ability to paint was diminished when his hands were impaired by rheumatoid arthritis and he had to fasten a brush to his hand to work. In April he went to Boston to undergo an experimental treatment with cortisone and corticotropin, based on the work of Philip S. Hench. It proved successful, and some of his next works were dedicated to the doctors and researchers in the United States. In 1952 he received the grand prize for painting in the 26th Venice Biennale. Dufy died of intestinal bleeding at Forcalquier, France, on 23 March 1953, likely the result of his continuous treatment. He was buried near Matisse in the Cimiez Monastery Cemetery in Cimiez, a suburb of the city of Nice.

== Collections ==
Among the public collections holding works by Raoul Dufy are:

- Metropolitan Museum Of Art
- Art Institute of Chicago, Chicago, IL, USA
- Museum Of Modern Art, New York
- Centre Pompidou, Paris
- Art Gallery of Ontario, Ontario, Canada
- Kalamazoo Institute of Arts, Kalamazoo, MI, USA
- McNay Art Museum, TX, USA
- Musée d'Art Moderne de Paris, Paris, France
- Musée des Beaux-Arts de Nice, Nice, France
- Museum de Fundatie, Zwolle, Netherlands
- National Gallery of Art, Washington, D.C., USA
- Unterlinden Museum, Colmar, France (Pink Nude, 1930)
- Van Abbemuseum, Netherlands
- Virginia Museum of Fine Arts, Richmond, VA, USA

== Selected works ==
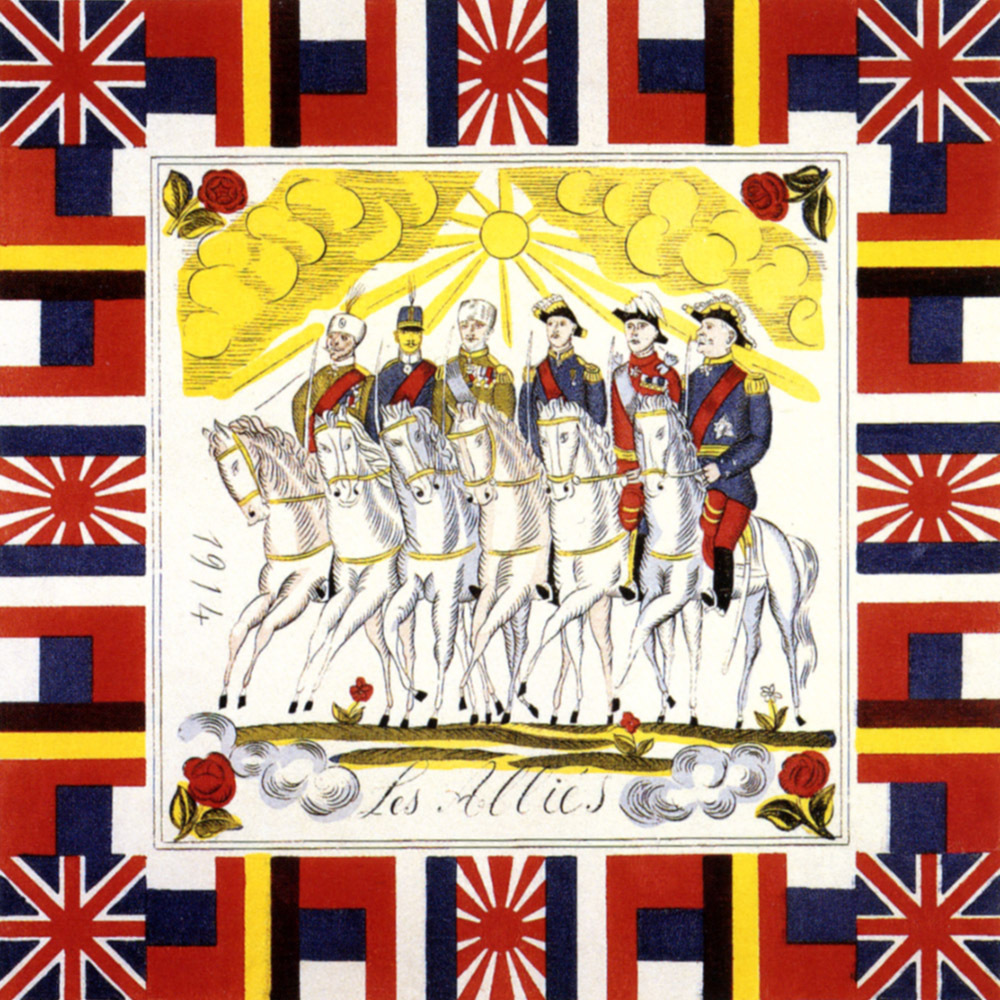
Les Alliés (1914)

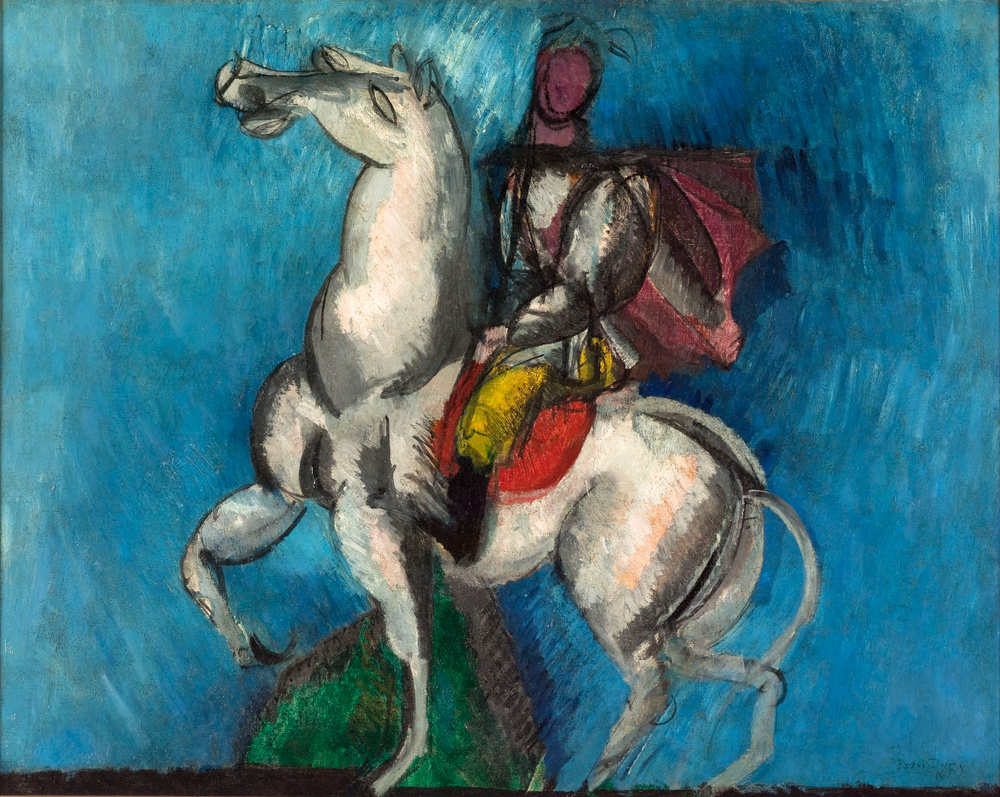
Le Cavalier arabe (Le Cavalier blanc) (1914), Musée d'Art Moderne de Paris

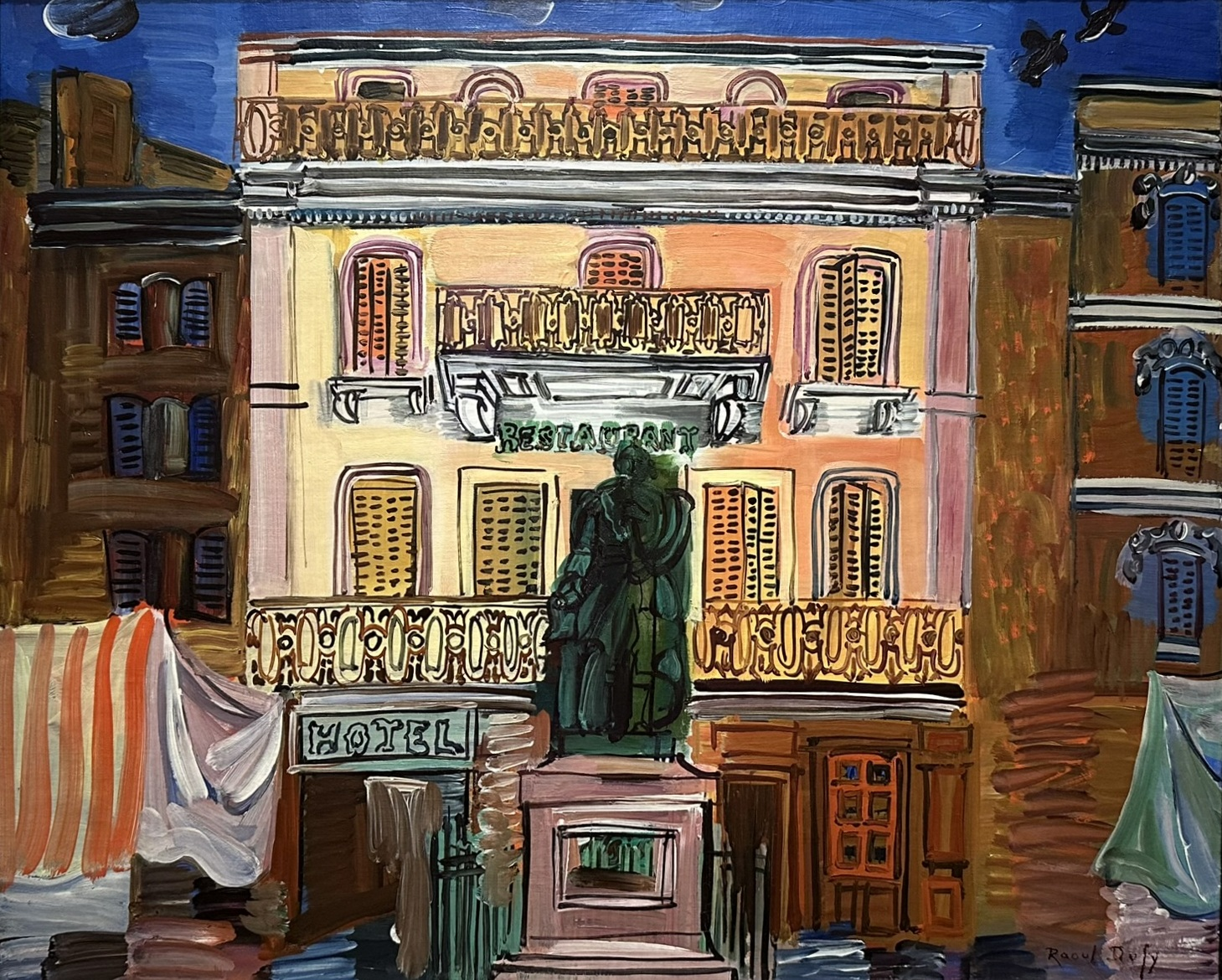
Hotel Sube (1926), The Phillips Collection

Regatta at Cowes (1934), National Gallery of Art

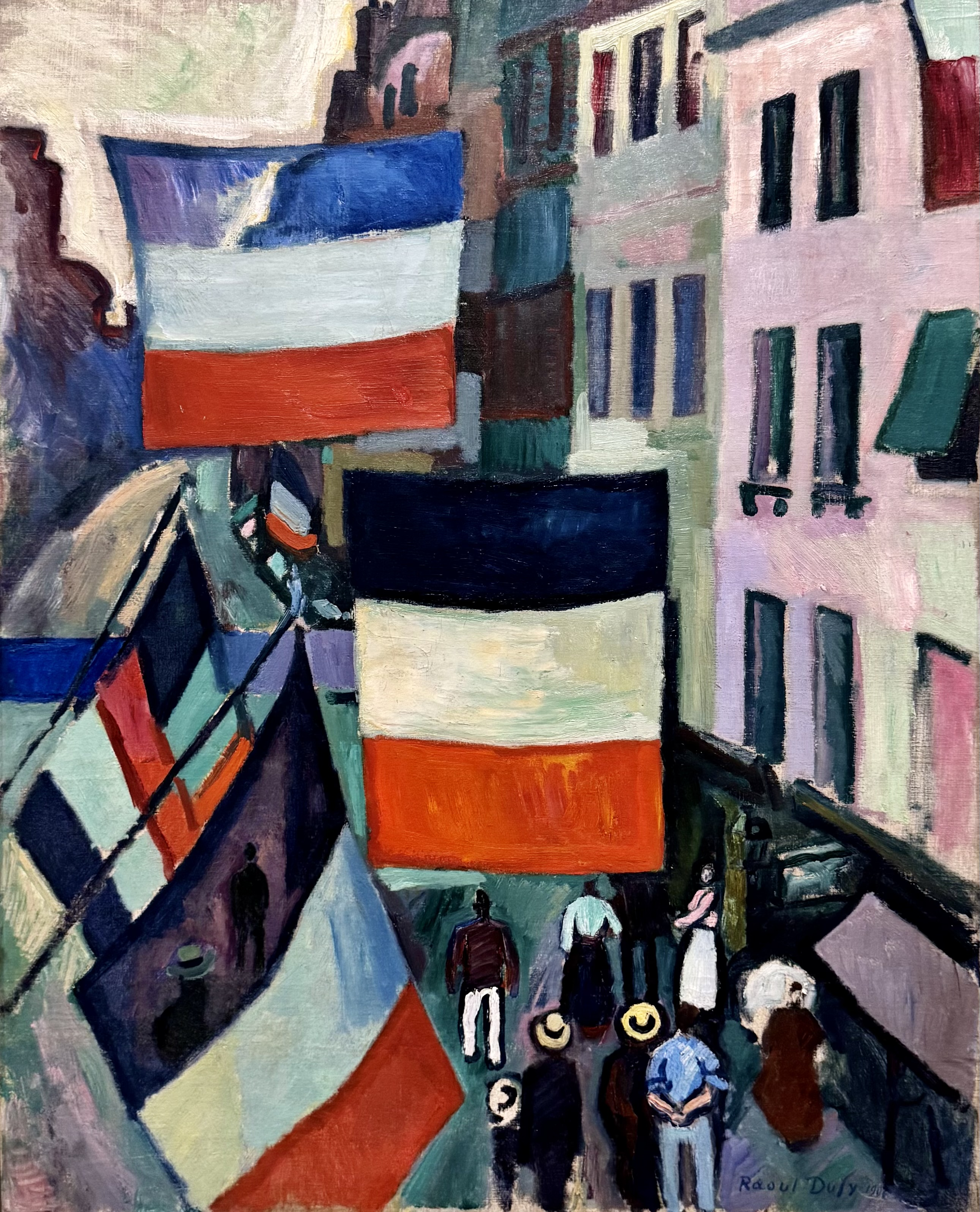
"Street Decked with Flags" (1906), Centre Pompidou, exhibited at the Montreal Museum of Fine Arts

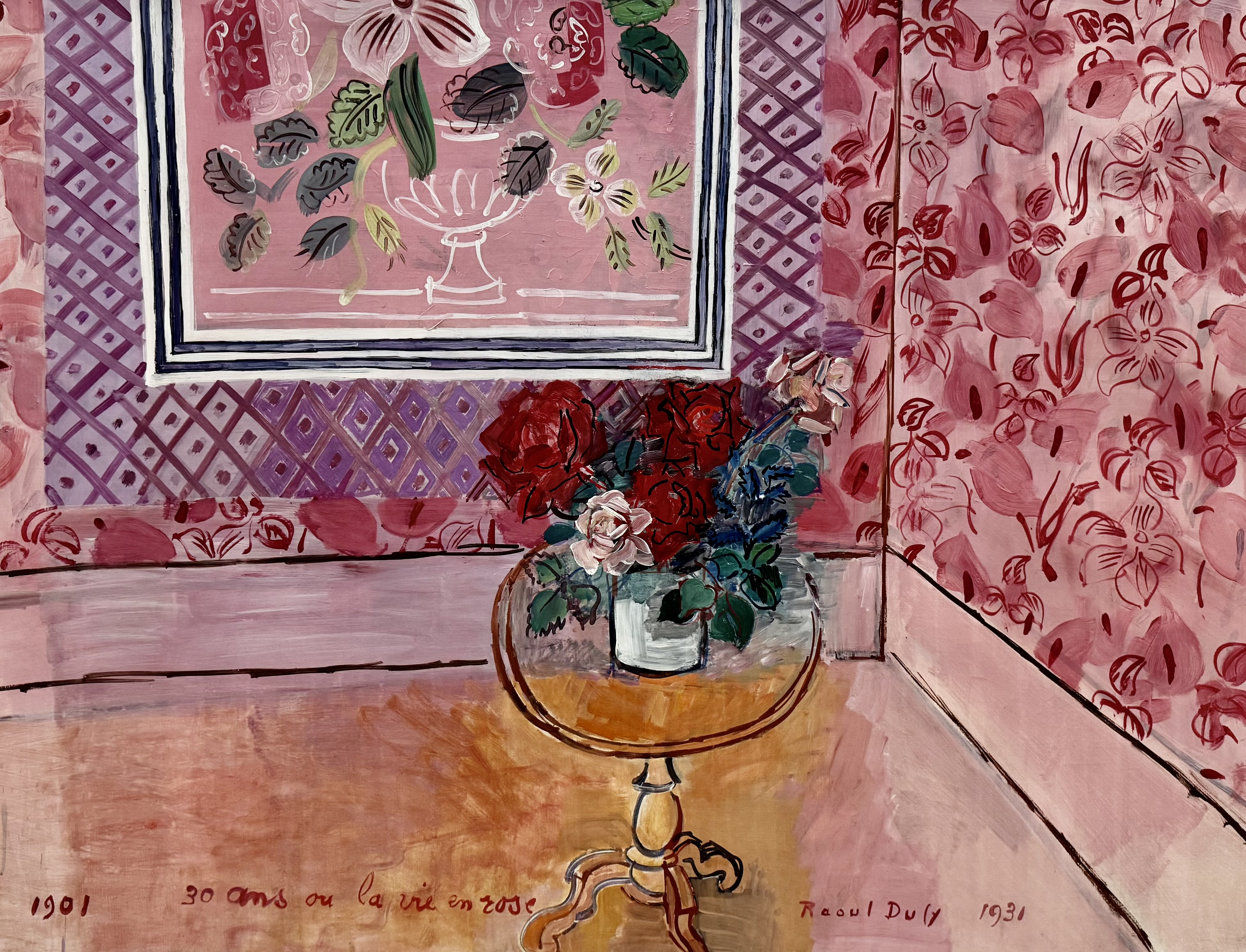
Thirty Years, or La Vie en Rose (1931), Montreal Museum of Fine Arts

Portrait of Jacques Maroger in the Guelma Impasse, 1939, Douai Chartreuse Museum

== Works ==
- Hommage à Mozart, (Web Gallery Private Art Collection)
- Le 14 juillet au Havre, rue pavoisée, (1906, Web Gallery Private Art Collection)
- Trees in L'Estaque, 1908 oil on canvas painting
- French modern art exhibition 1939 treasure 3 National Library of Latvia displayed via The European Library
- Works by Raoul Dufy (public domain in Canada)
- Raoul Dufy's artworks in context, Museum of modern art André Malraux

== Illustrations ==
- Jean Cocteau, Bertrand Guégan (1892-1943); L'almanach de Cocagne pour l'an 1920-1922, Dédié aux vrais Gourmands Et aux Francs Buveurs

== See also ==
- List of Orientalist artists
- Orientalism
