= Pink Nude =

Painting by Raoul Dufy

- French: Nu rose
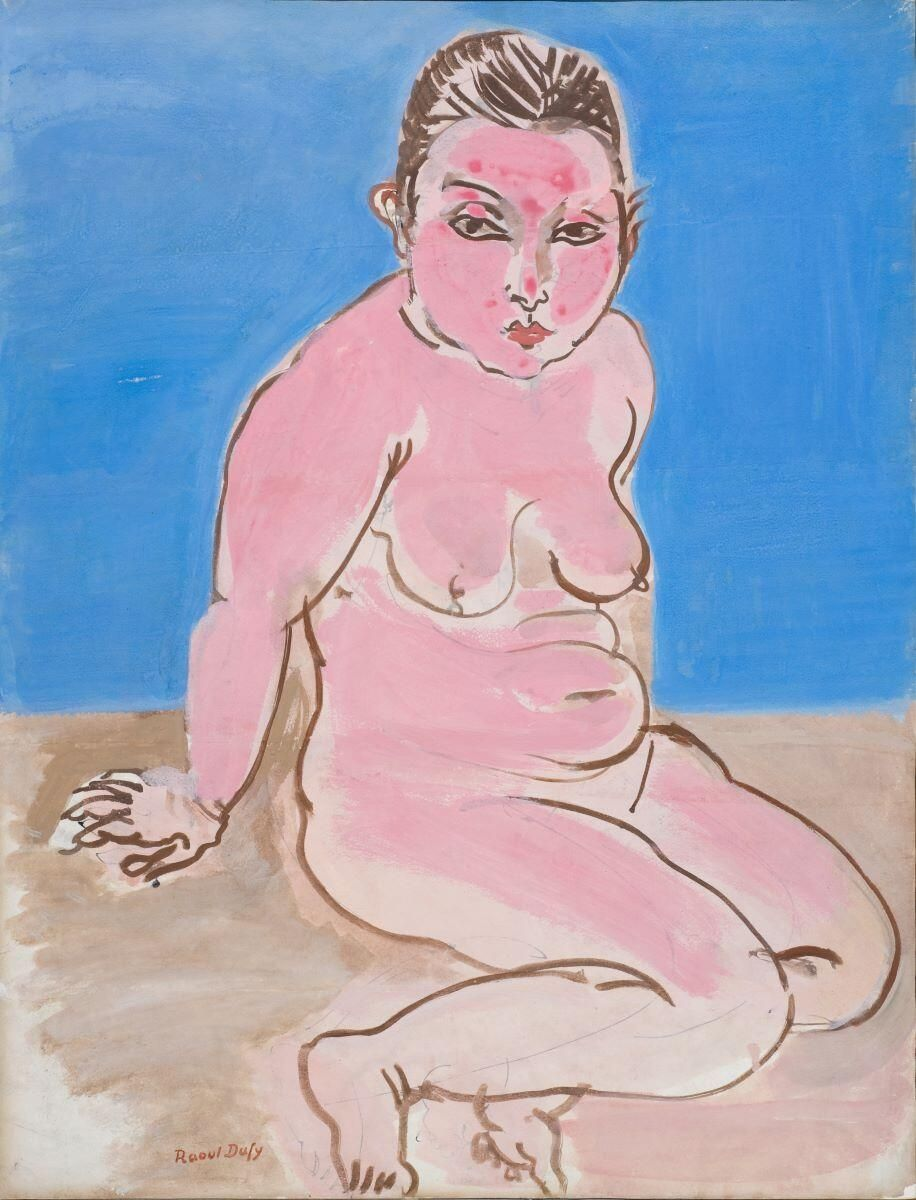
- Artist: Raoul Dufy
- Year: 1930
- Medium: Gouache on paper on canvas
- Movement: Nude
- Subject: an unclothed woman
- Dimensions: 65 cm × 50 cm (26 in × 20 in)
- Location: Unterlinden Museum, Colmar
- Accession: 2008

Pink Nude is a gouache painting on paper fixed on canvas by the French artist Raoul Dufy, from 1930. It is held in the collection of the Unterlinden Museum in Colmar, Alsace (inventory number 2008.8.63). The painting is one of the more than 120 works of French modern art that were bequeathed to the museum by the collector, French journalist Jean-Paul Person (1927–2008), in 2008 (Person had already donated 16 works to the museum in 2004). Pink Nude depicts a sitting, plain woman on a sand-coloured ground and in front of a blue background; the scenery may be a beach. Dufy painted this work in his Montmartre studio, impasse de Guelma, as part of a series of female nudes that he launched himself into in 1930, at the height of his maturity.
