= Normand Landscape =

Painting by Pierre Bonnard

- French: Paysage normand
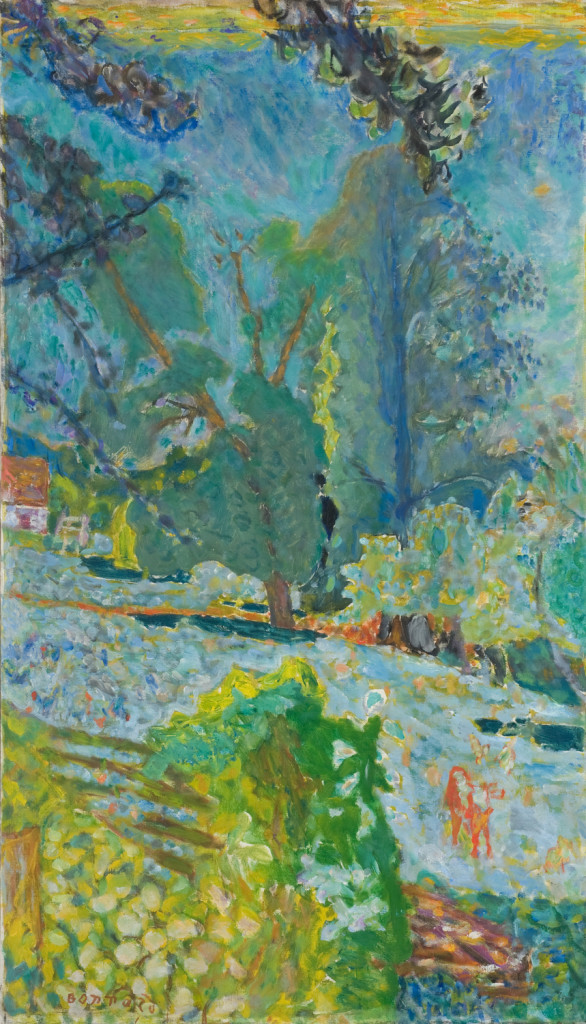
- Artist: Pierre Bonnard
- Year: 1920
- Medium: oil paint on canvas
- Subject: a landscape in Normandy
- Dimensions: 100 cm × 58 cm (39 in × 23 in)
- Location: Unterlinden Museum, Colmar
- Accession: 1981

Normand Landscape is an oil painting by the French artist Pierre Bonnard, from 1920. It is held in the collection of the Unterlinden Museum in Colmar, Alsace (inventory number 81.3.1). It depicts a landscape in Normandy, in a vertical format. The motif was painted from memory in the artist's studio, not en plein air. The painting was bought as soon as it was finished, in 1920, by the gallery Bernheim-Jeune, from which it was bought six decades later by the Société Schongauer which administers the Colmar museum.

A later Bonnard painting, Landscape in Normandy (1930), today belongs to the Smith College Museum of Art in Northampton, Massachusetts.
