= Still Life with a Parrot =

Painting by Robert Delaunay

- Nature morte au perroquet (French)
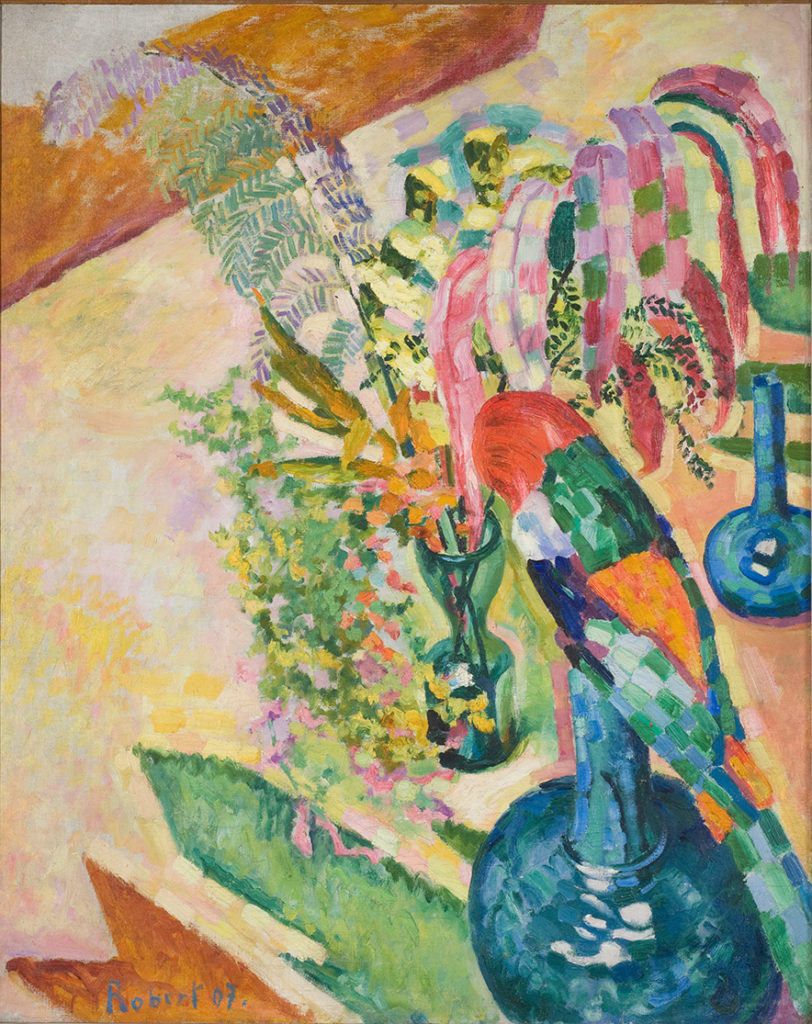
- Artist: Robert Delaunay
- Year: 1907
- Medium: oil paint on canvas on panel
- Movement: still life
- Subject: flowers and a parrot
- Dimensions: 82.5 cm × 66.5 cm (32.5 in × 26.2 in)
- Location: Unterlinden Museum, Colmar
- Accession: 1978

Still Life with a Parrot is an oil painting on canvas by the French artist Robert Delaunay, from 1907. It is held in the Unterlinden Museum, in Colmar, Alsace (inventory number 88.RP.71).

== History and description ==
The Colmar painting is a manifestation of the young artist's interest in Michel-Eugène Chevreul's theories on colours, and one of his first experimental works. The painting had belonged to the art dealer Louis Carré (1897–1977) and was bought after his death by the Société Schongauer which administrates the museum since its foundation.

A first version of the same motif, but in a more mosaic-like design, nowadays belongs to the Thyssen-Bornemisza Museum in Madrid, Spain.
