= Unterlinden Museum =

Art, history, and design museum in Colmar, France

Coordinates: 48°04′47″N 7°21′20″E

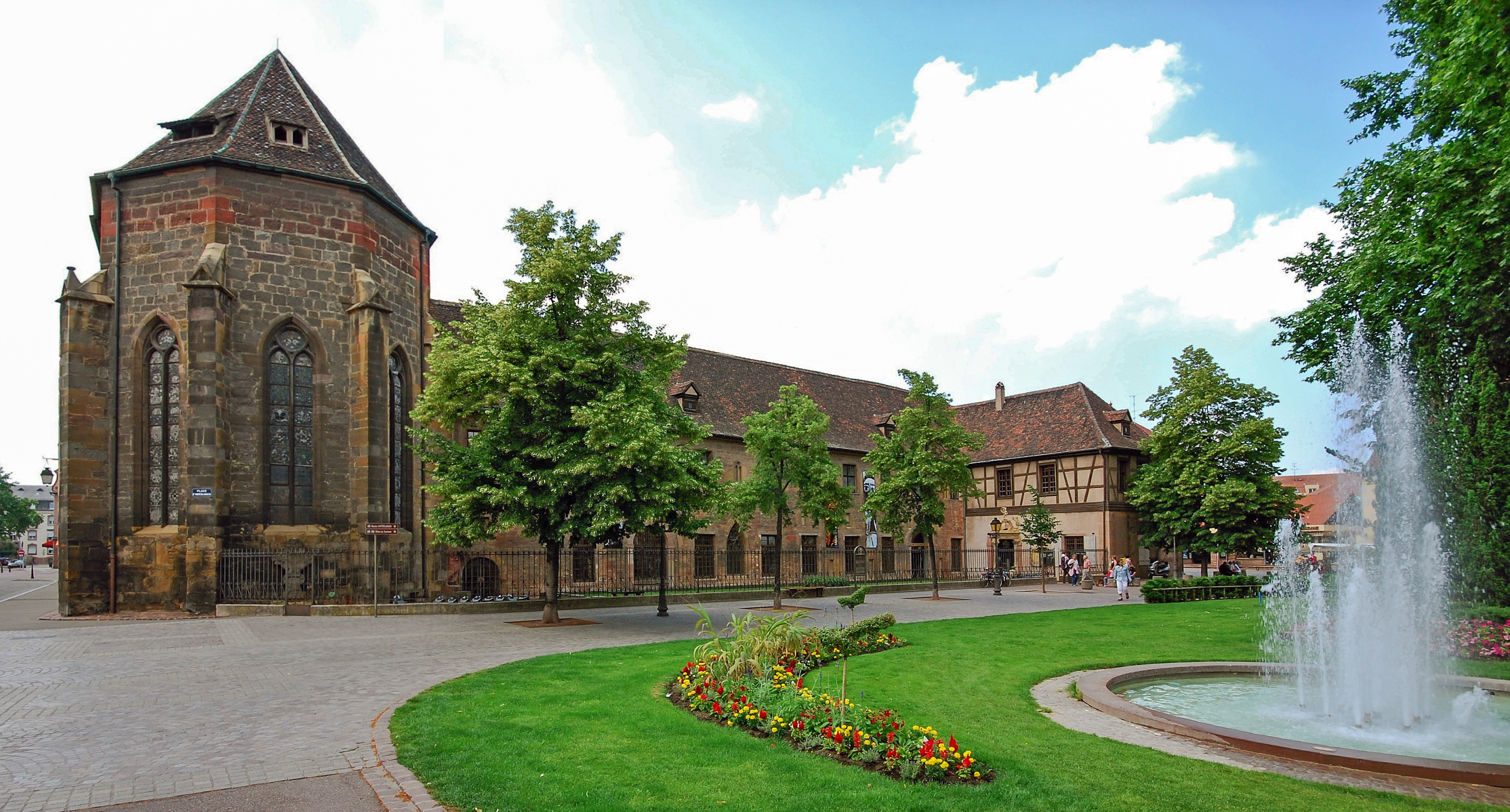
- Established: 1853
- Location: 1, rue d'Unterlinden; 68000 Colmar, France
- Type: Art museum History museum Design museum
- Visitors: 200,000 per year
- Director: Camille Broucke
- Website: www.musee-unterlinden.com

The Unterlinden Museum (French: Musée Unterlinden) is located in Colmar, in the Alsace region of France. The museum, housed in a 13th-century Dominican religious sisters' convent and a 1906 former public baths building, is home to the Isenheim Altarpiece by the German Renaissance painter Matthias Grünewald and features a large collection of local and international artworks and manufactured artifacts from prehistorical to contemporary times. It is a Musée de France. With roughly 200,000 visitors per year, the museum is the most visited in Alsace.

== History ==
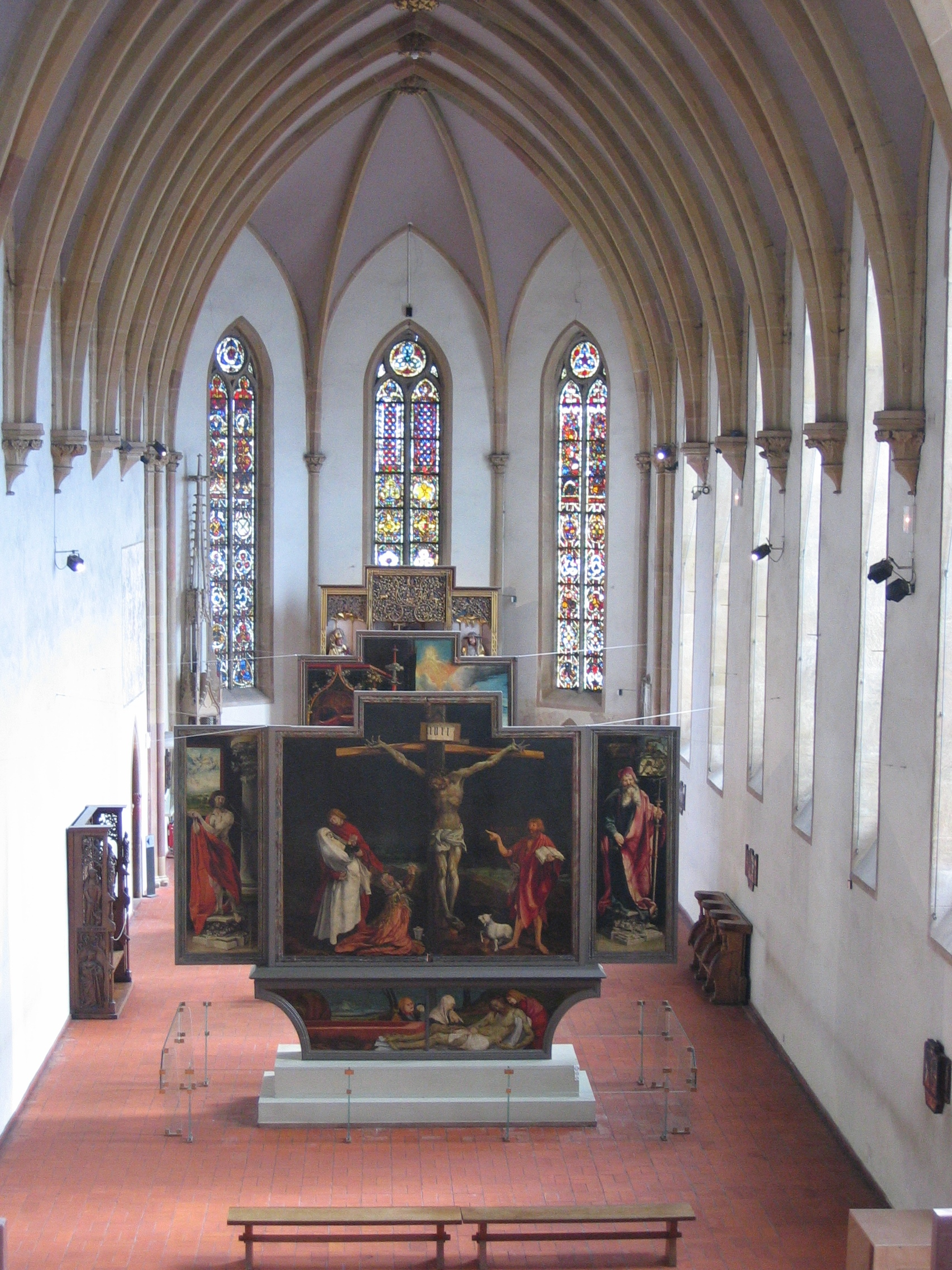
View (from the 18th century loft) of the chapel, constructed 1262–1269, and the Isenheim Altarpiece

The museum was established in 1849, the buildings (abandoned following the French Revolution) having been saved by the Societé Schongauer (founded in 1847 by Louis Hugot) and bequeathed to it by the municipality. The collection at first centered around a Roman mosaic found in Bergheim, Haut-Rhin, still displayed today, and plaster copies of antique sculptures on loan from the Louvre. In 1852, the focus of the collection shifted dramatically, when the Isenheim Altarpiece as well as most of the other large painted and/or sculpted altarpieces from former Colmar or Upper Rhenish churches, abbeys and monasteries, were installed in the building. The museum opened its doors to the general public in the following year, 1853.

In the 1950s, and again in the 1980s, the need appeared for the museum, which had seen a steady growth of the number of its displayed artefacts in every domain, to gain more space by using available surface more appropriately, and was each time addressed as far as the classified character of the building in itself could allow. When that same need appeared again in the 2000s, the city of Colmar decided to add supplementary buildings. As the museum's official website used to state before the opening of the 2015 extension: "Today the museum covers a surface area of about 5,620 m², including exhibition spaces (4,000 m²), conservation, storage and other work areas (1,370 m²), and offices (250 m²)". Between 2009, and 2015, the adjacent, Neo-Baroque former baths building was transformed into an annex of the museum, connected to the old building by a series of underground exhibition rooms. A new building for temporary exhibitions was also added while the former cloister was once again thoroughly renovated and its interior spaces redistributed. The total area open to the public was thus enlarged to 8,000 m^{2} (86,000 sq ft), at an official cost of 44 M€, although it appeared at the end of the year 2016, that the final cost was actually of 48,7 M€, a fact which infuriated Colmar's long-time mayor, Gilbert Meyer. The opening of the enlarged museum took place on 12 December 2015.

== The collections ==
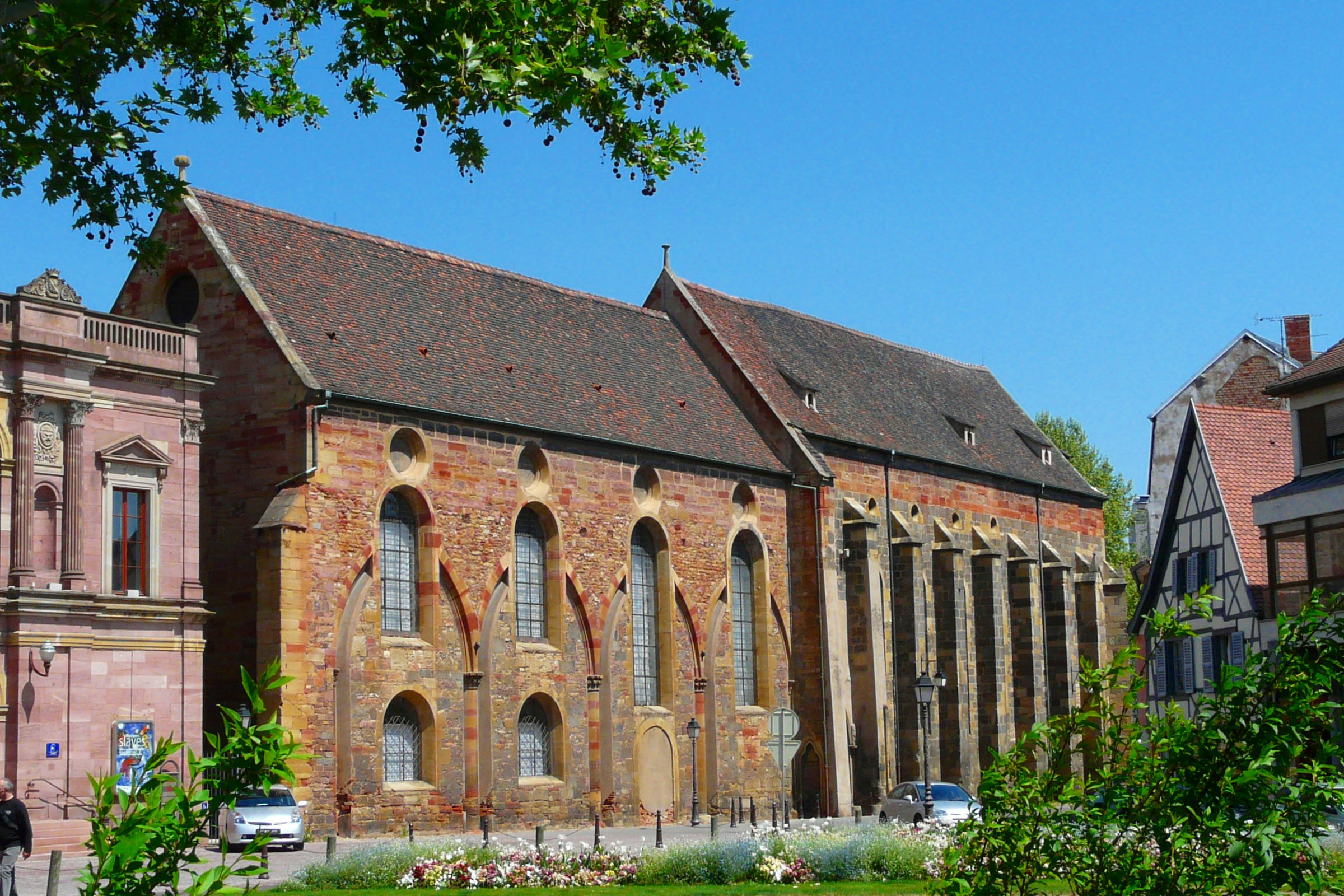
Outside view of the chapel

Famous above all for the Isenheim Altarpiece by Matthias Grünewald, it also displays a major collection of Upper Rhenish medieval and early Renaissance art, among which the Colmar native Martin Schongauer occupies the most prominent place with several altarpieces and a large number of original drawings, engravings and woodcuts. Other famous names include Albrecht Dürer (engravings only), Lucas Cranach the Elder and Hans Holbein the Elder as well as local painters Caspar Isenmann, Jost Haller (Tempelhof Altarpiece), and Wilhelm Stetter. Most of the earliest paintings, however, are the work of anonymous German, Alsatian or Swiss masters, such as the Master of the Stauffenberg Altarpiece. Other sections displayed by the museum are : local and international archeology; medieval, Renaissance and baroque sculpture (religious as well as profane) and stained glass; weapons, furniture, music instruments and toys from the 14th to the 19th century; ancient, ornate wine barrels (a collection donated by Jean-Jacques Waltz in 1927); modern and contemporary art. Because of a general lack of space, this last collection, although very well furnished (works by Pablo Picasso, Jean Dubuffet, Fernand Léger, Serge Poliakoff, Georges Rouault, Pierre Bonnard, Robert Delaunay, Otto Dix, Maria Helena Vieira da Silva and others) had only seldom been displayed in its entirety. The 2015 enlargement of the building by the Swiss architects Herzog & de Meuron has explicitly been meant to address this problem.

== Expansion ==
In order to renovate the museum and provide more space to its collections, in 2009, the Colmar municipality organized a design competition, and eventually selected the Swiss architects Herzog & de Meuron to design the renovation project. The new venue, which almost doubles the floor area of the old Unterlinden museum, was inaugurated January 23, 2016 by the President of France François Hollande.

== Gallery ==
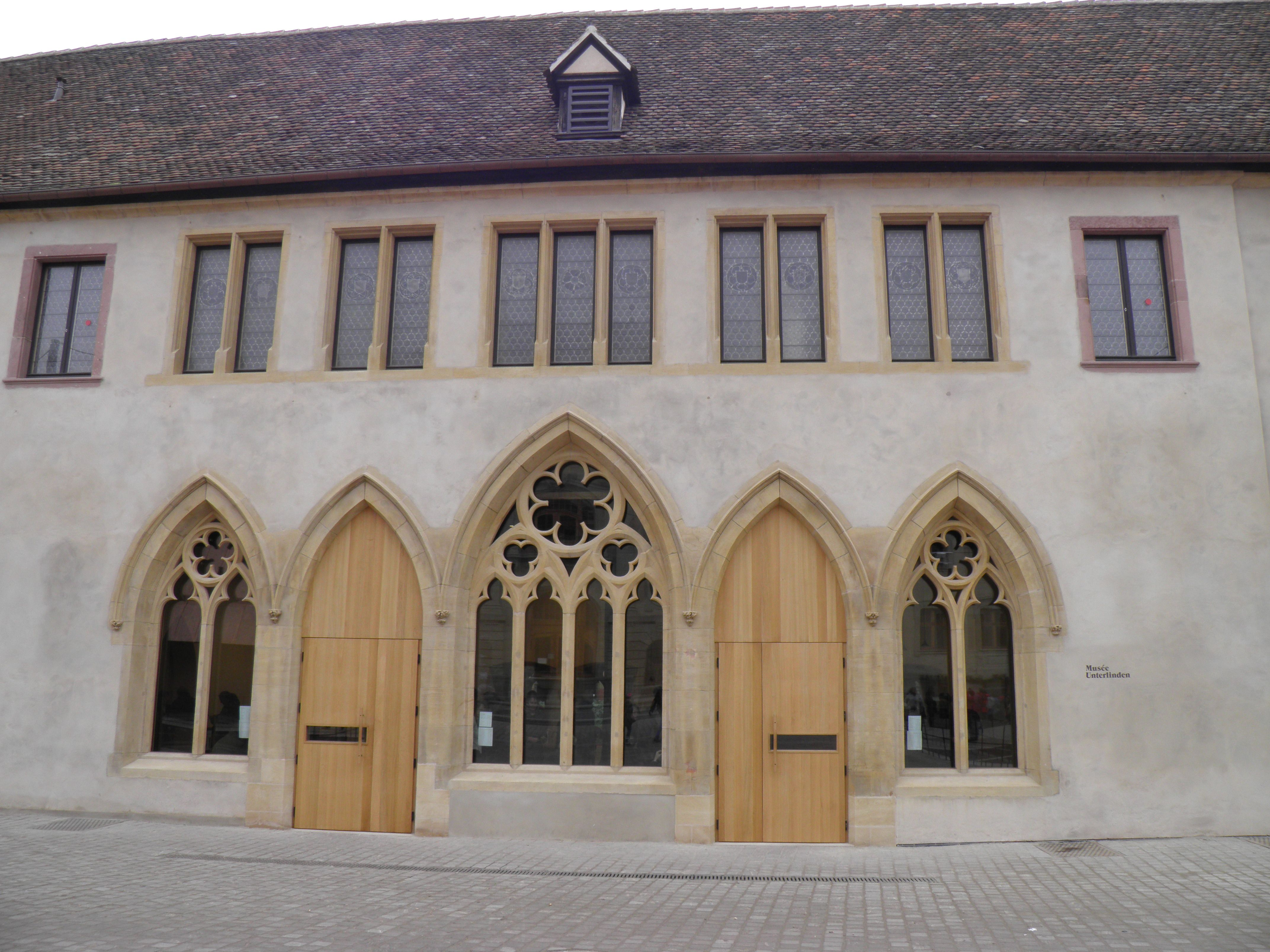
Main entrance of the museum

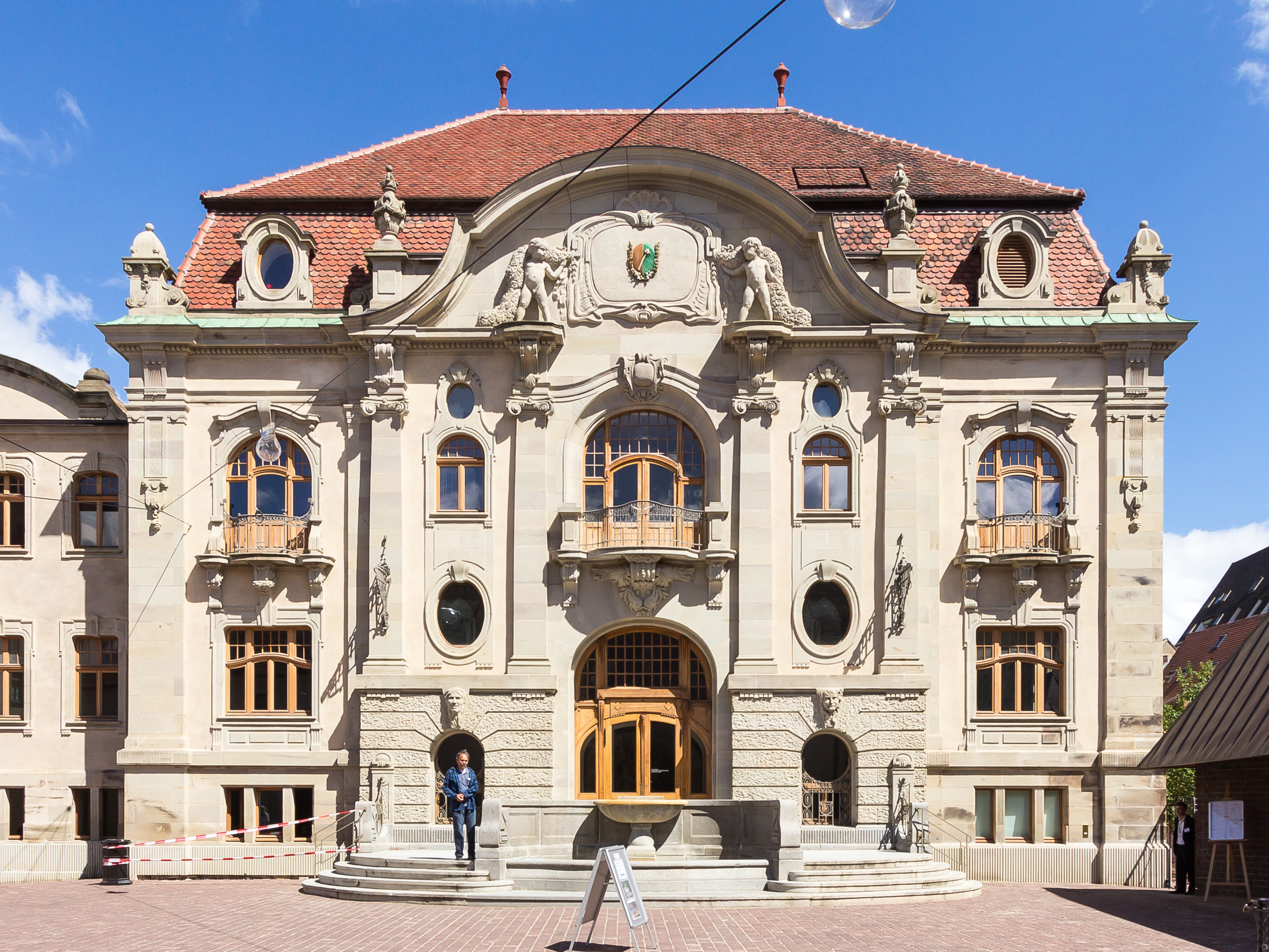
New aisle of the museum, the former public baths

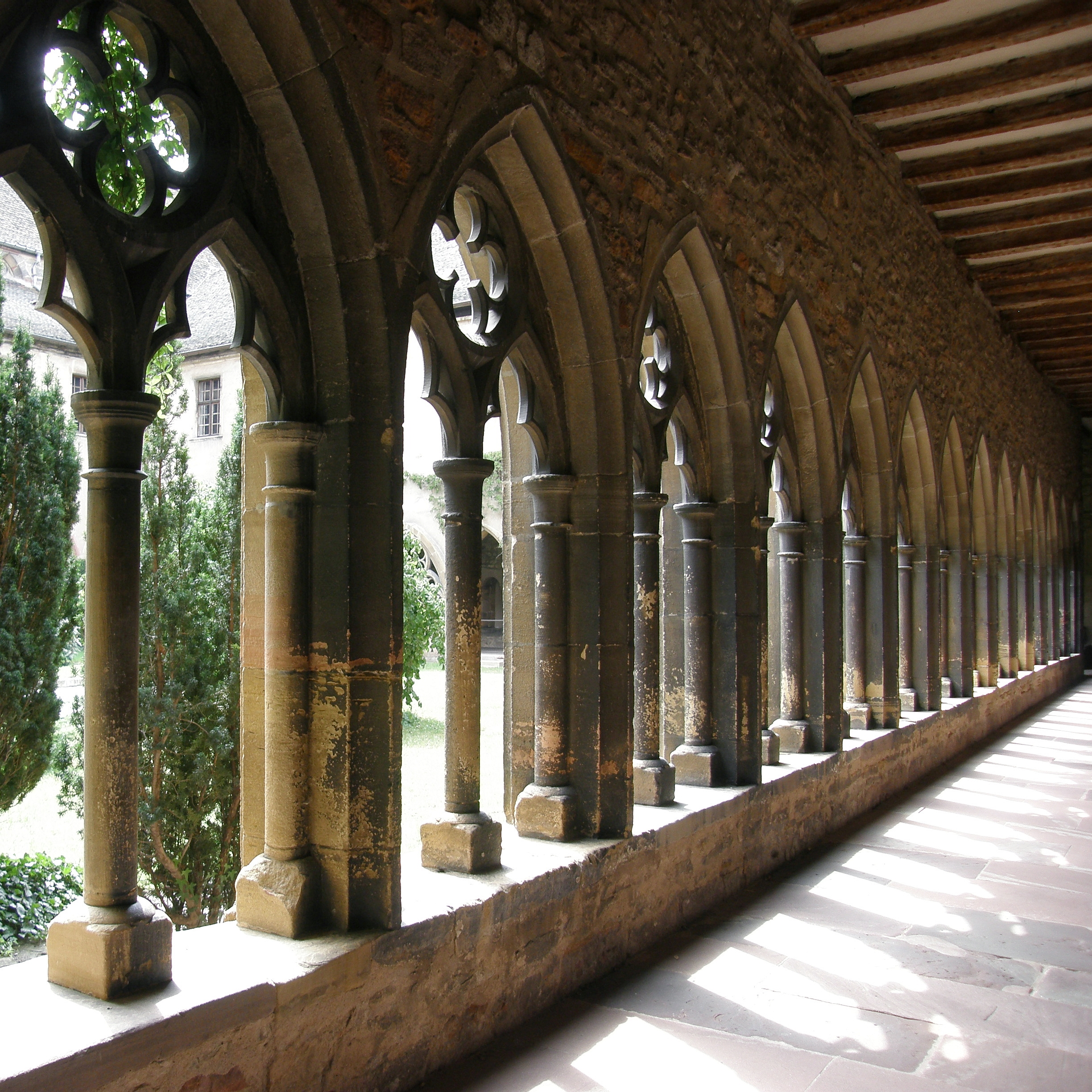
The cloister

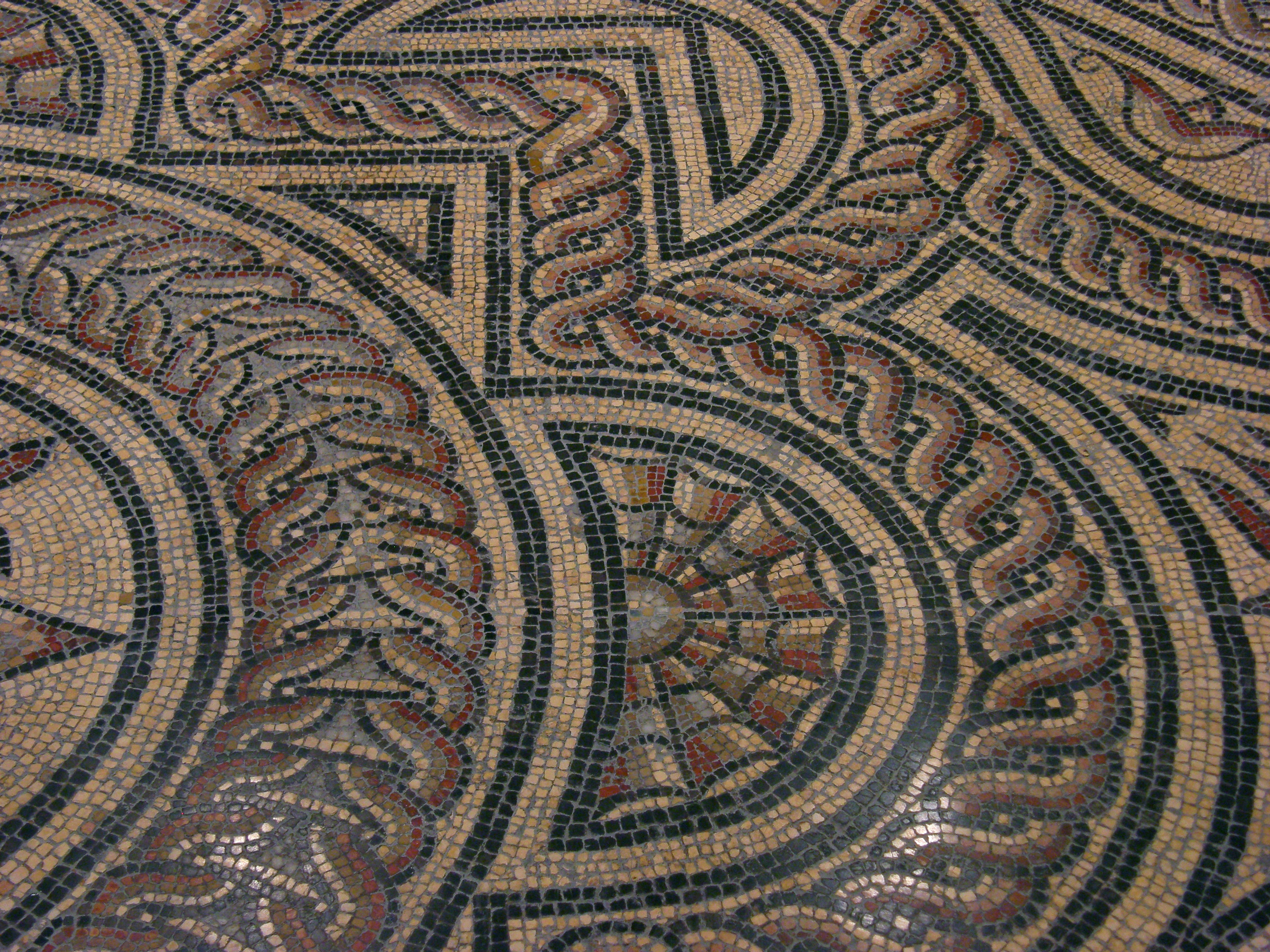
Gallo-Roman mosaic from Bergheim, Haut-Rhin (detail)

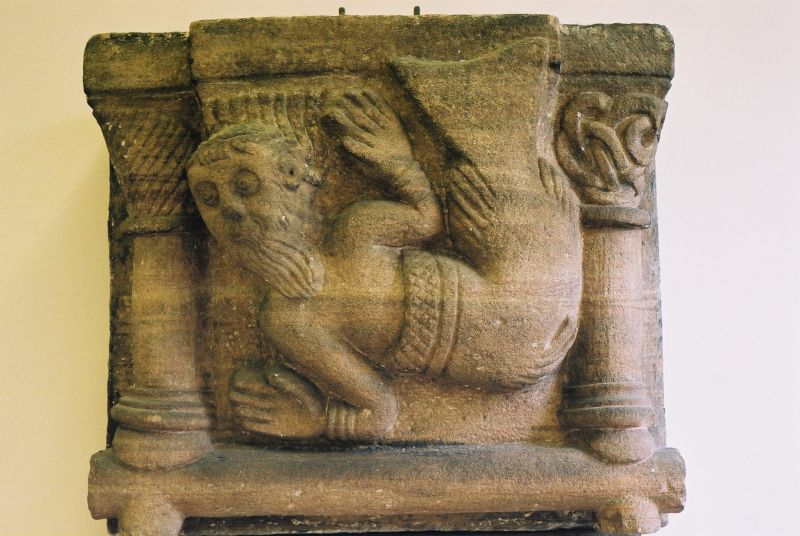
Romanesque capital with merman

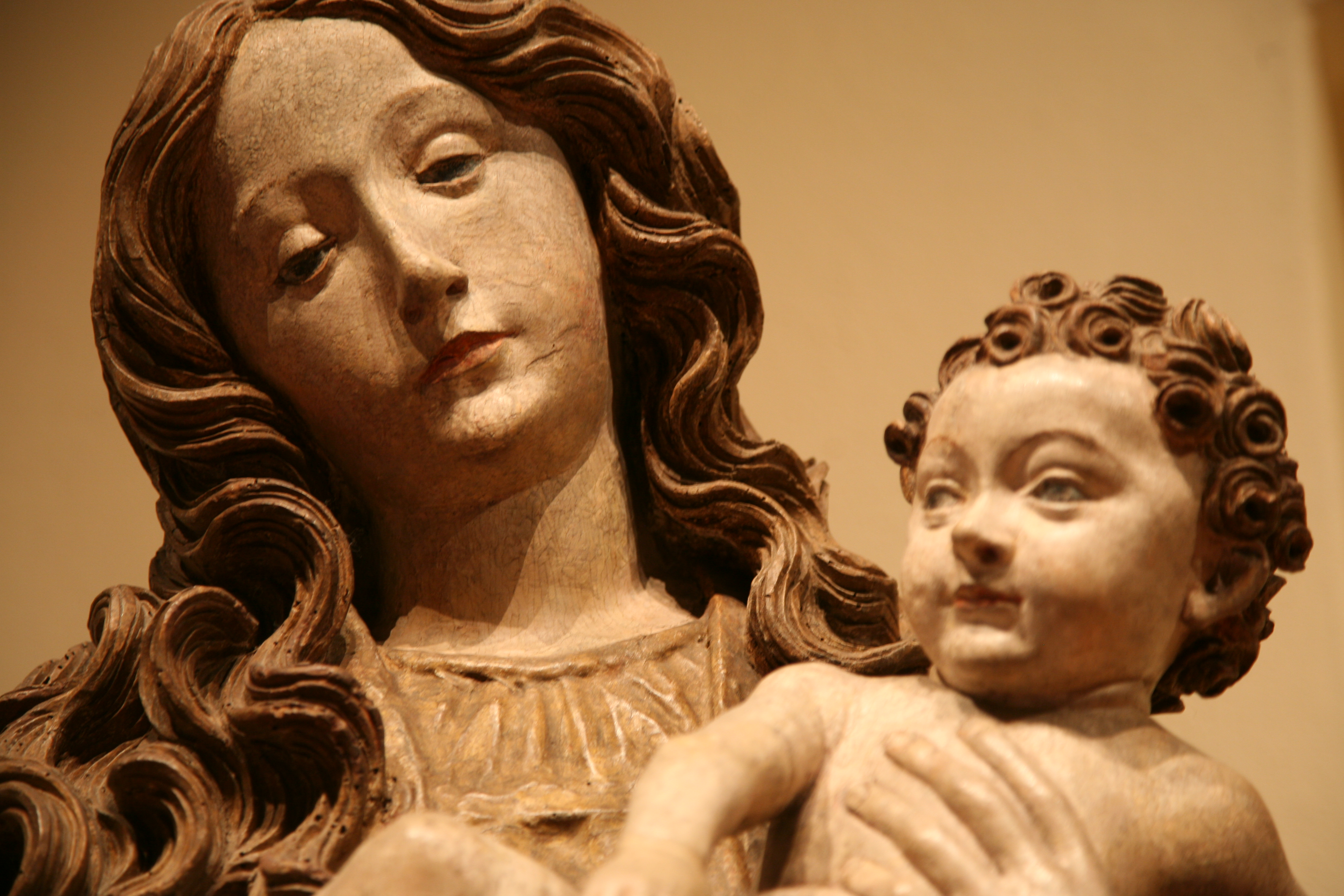
Upper Rhenish Master, Madonna with Child aka. Virgin of Niedermorschwihr

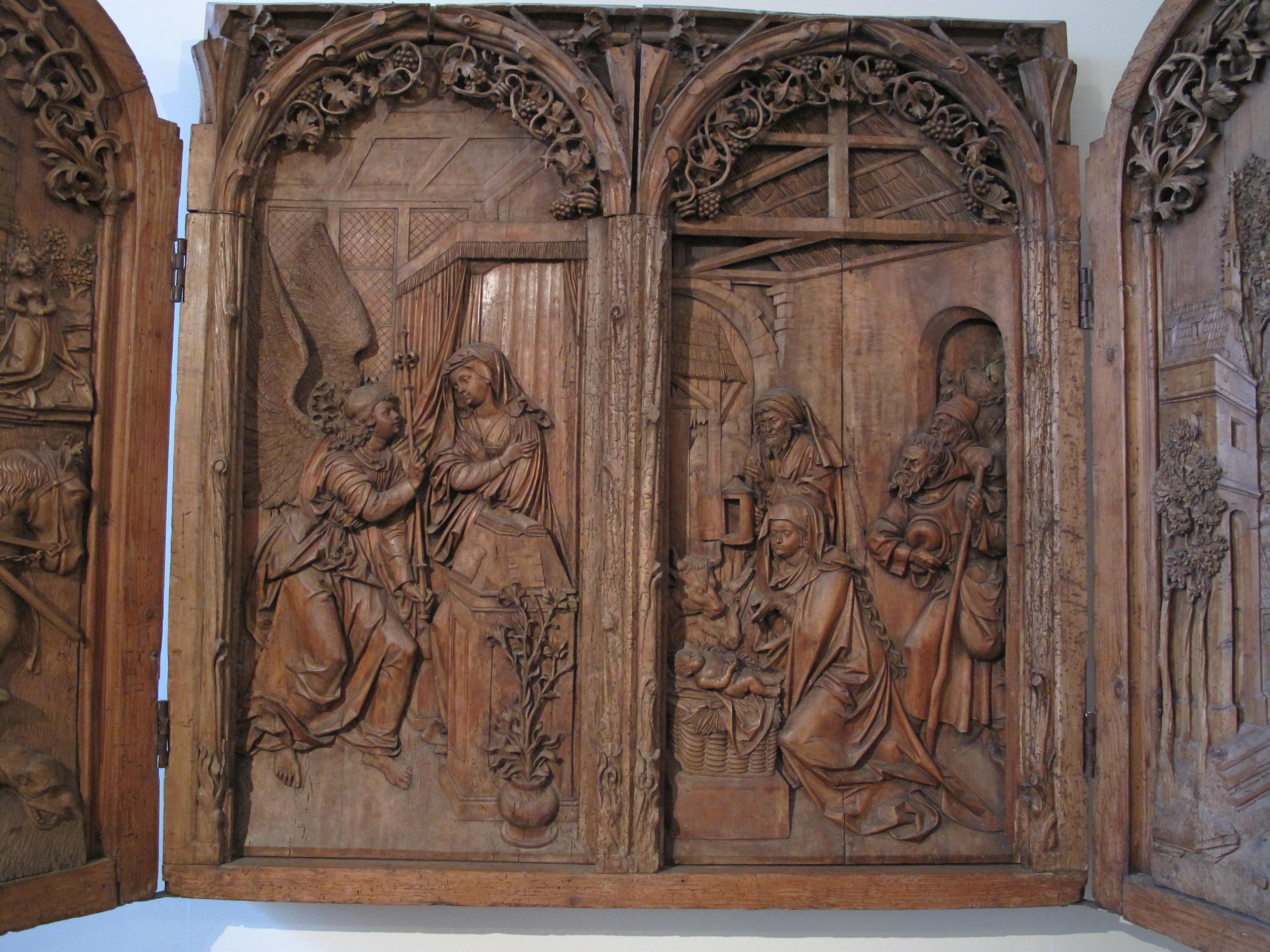
Veit Wagner (attributed to), Bergheim altarpiece (detail)

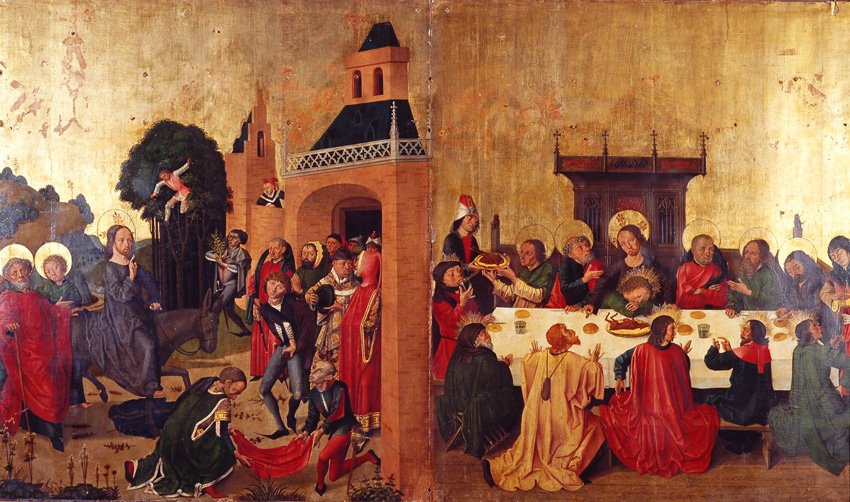
Caspar (or Gaspard) Isenmann, Entry into Jerusalem and Last Supper

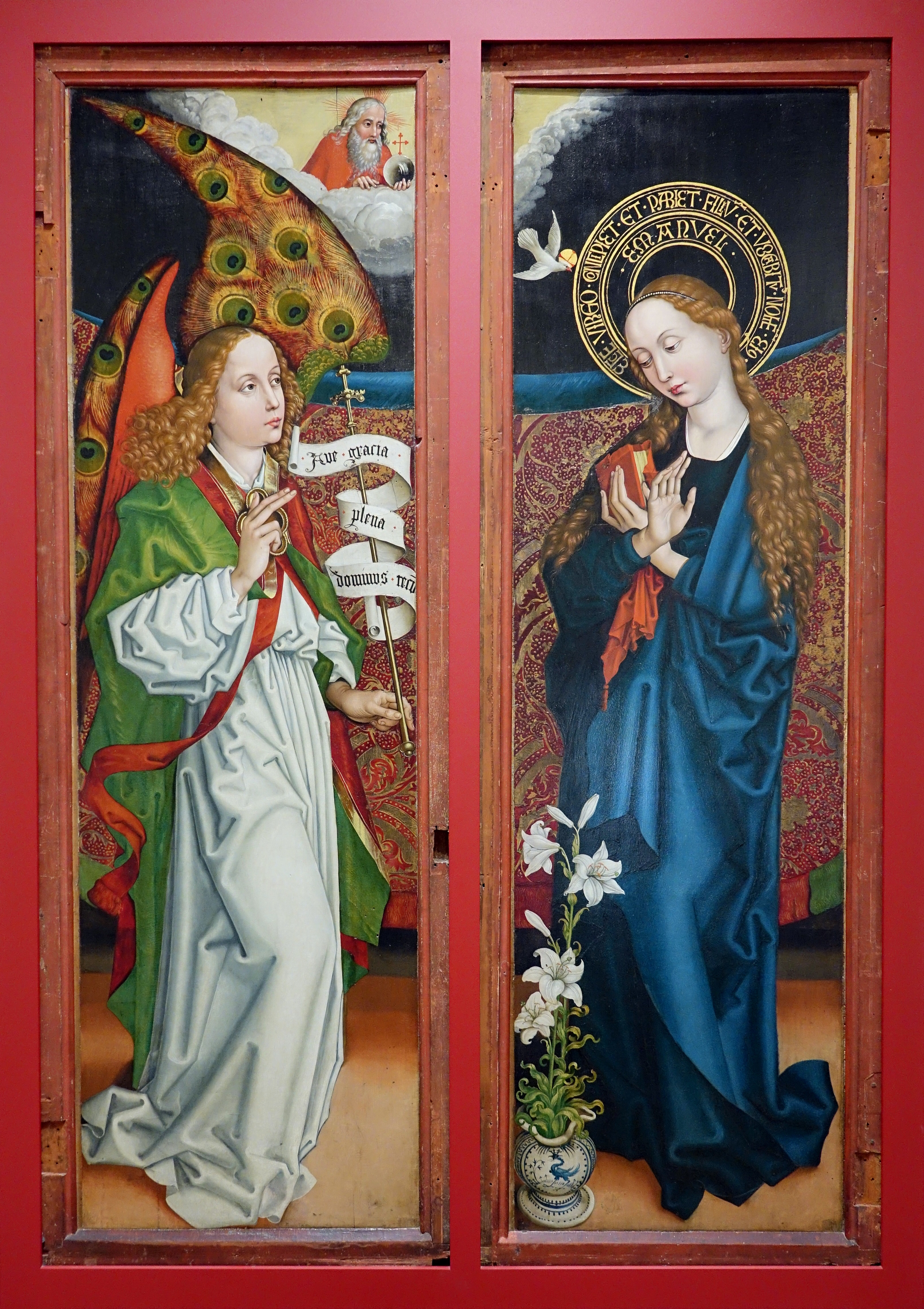
Martin Schongauer, Orlier Altarpiece: Annunciation

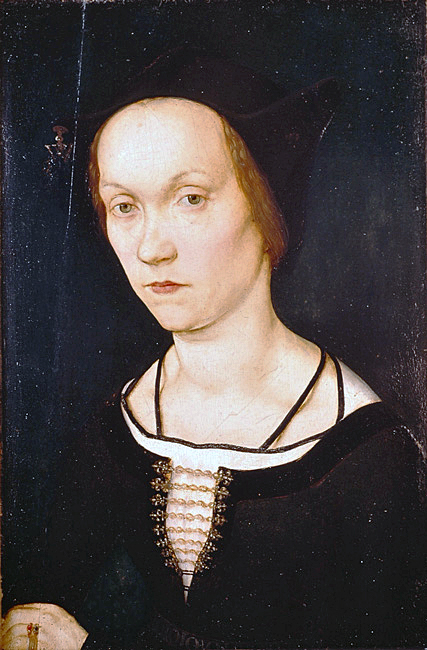
Hans Holbein the Elder, Portrait of a Woman

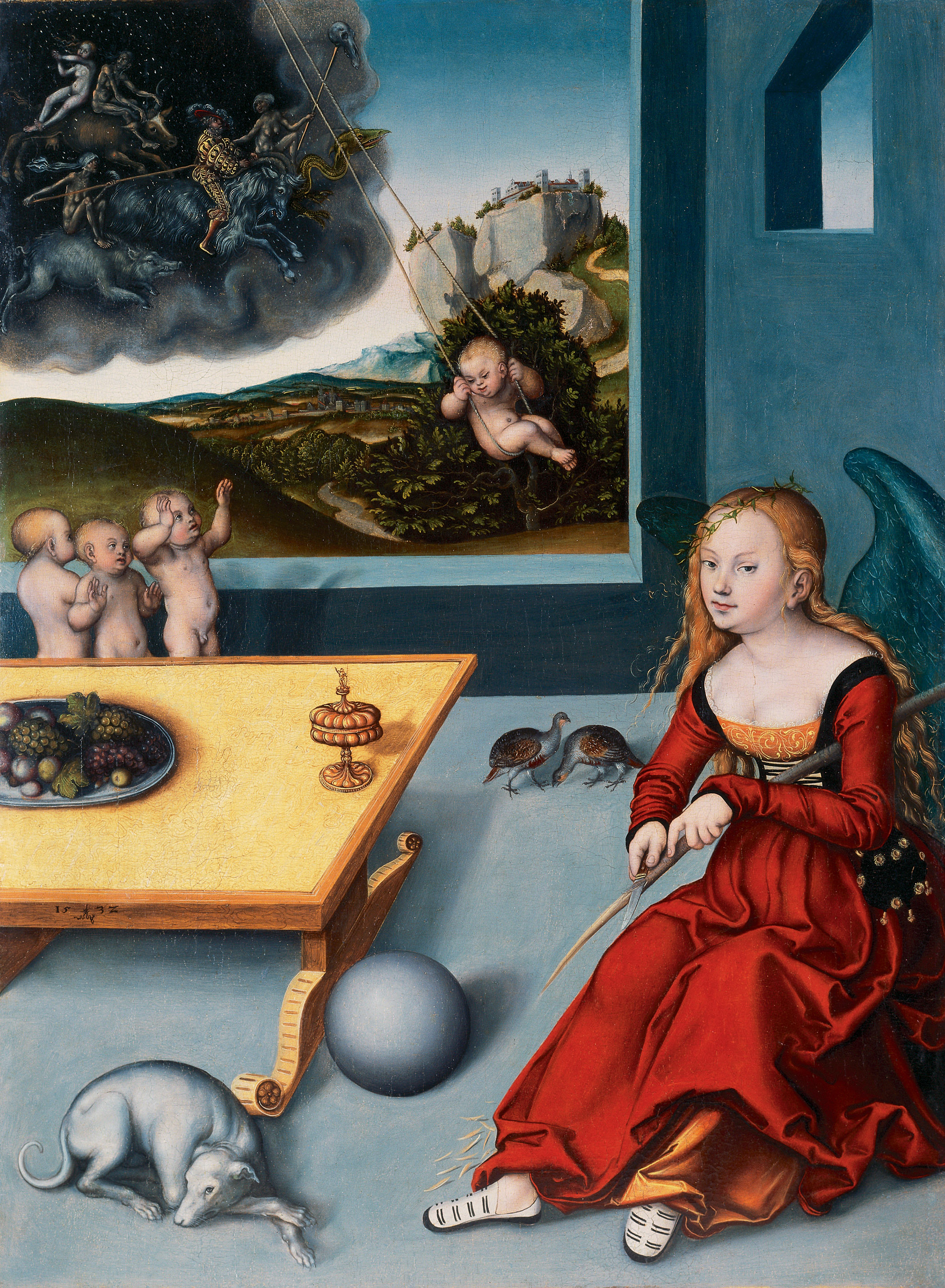
Lucas Cranach the Elder, Melancholy

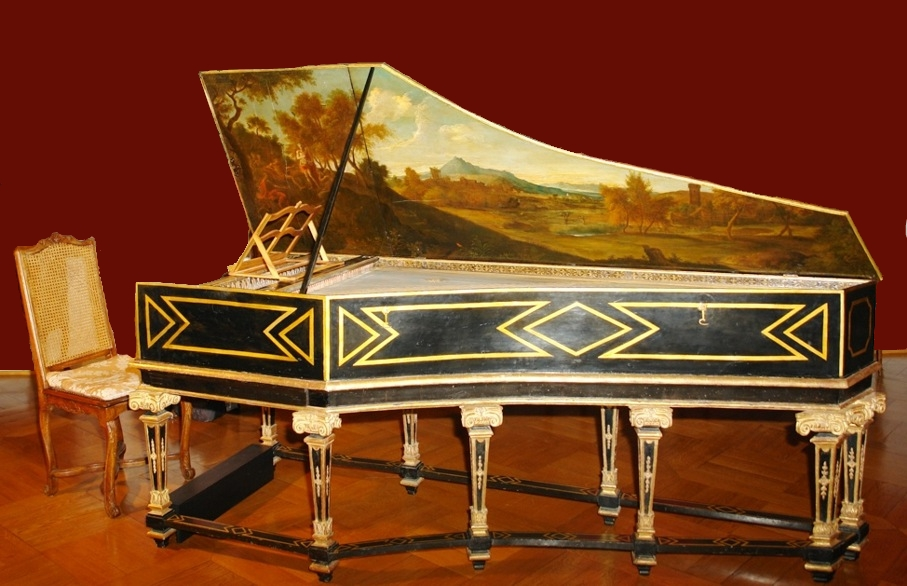
Ruckers harpsichord from Flanders, built 1624

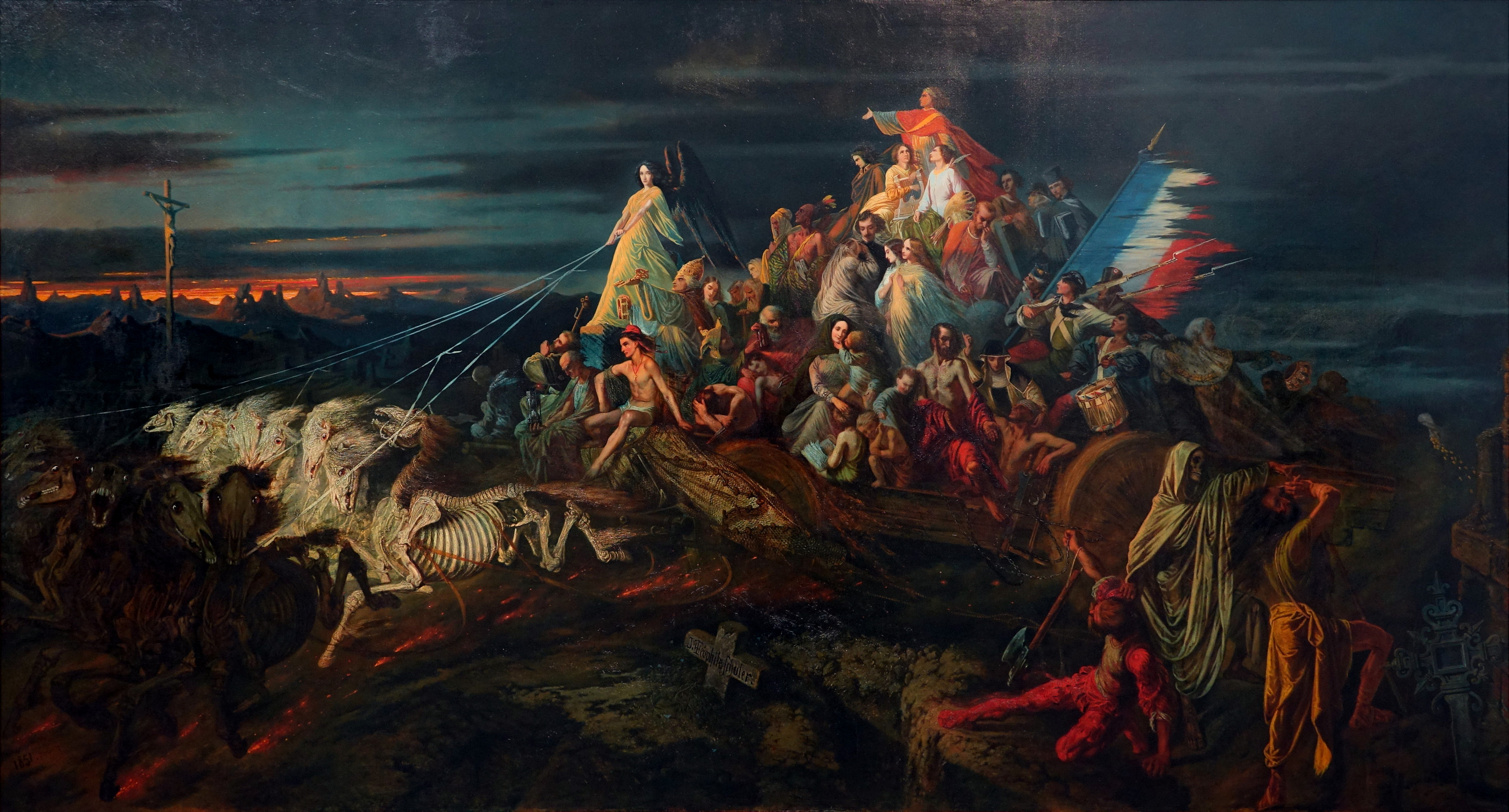
Théophile Schuler, The Chariot of Death

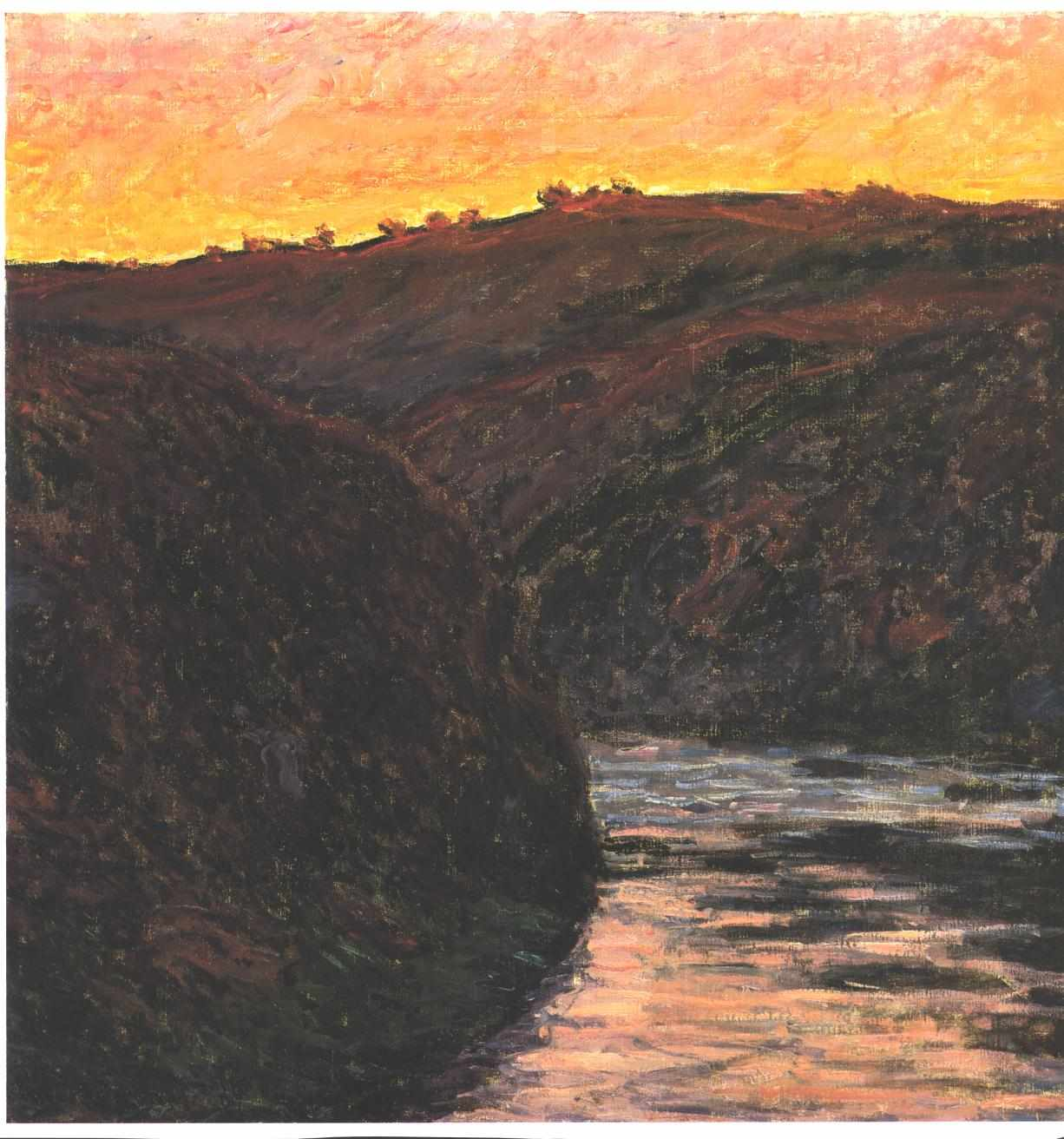
Claude Monet, The Valley of the Creuse, Sunset

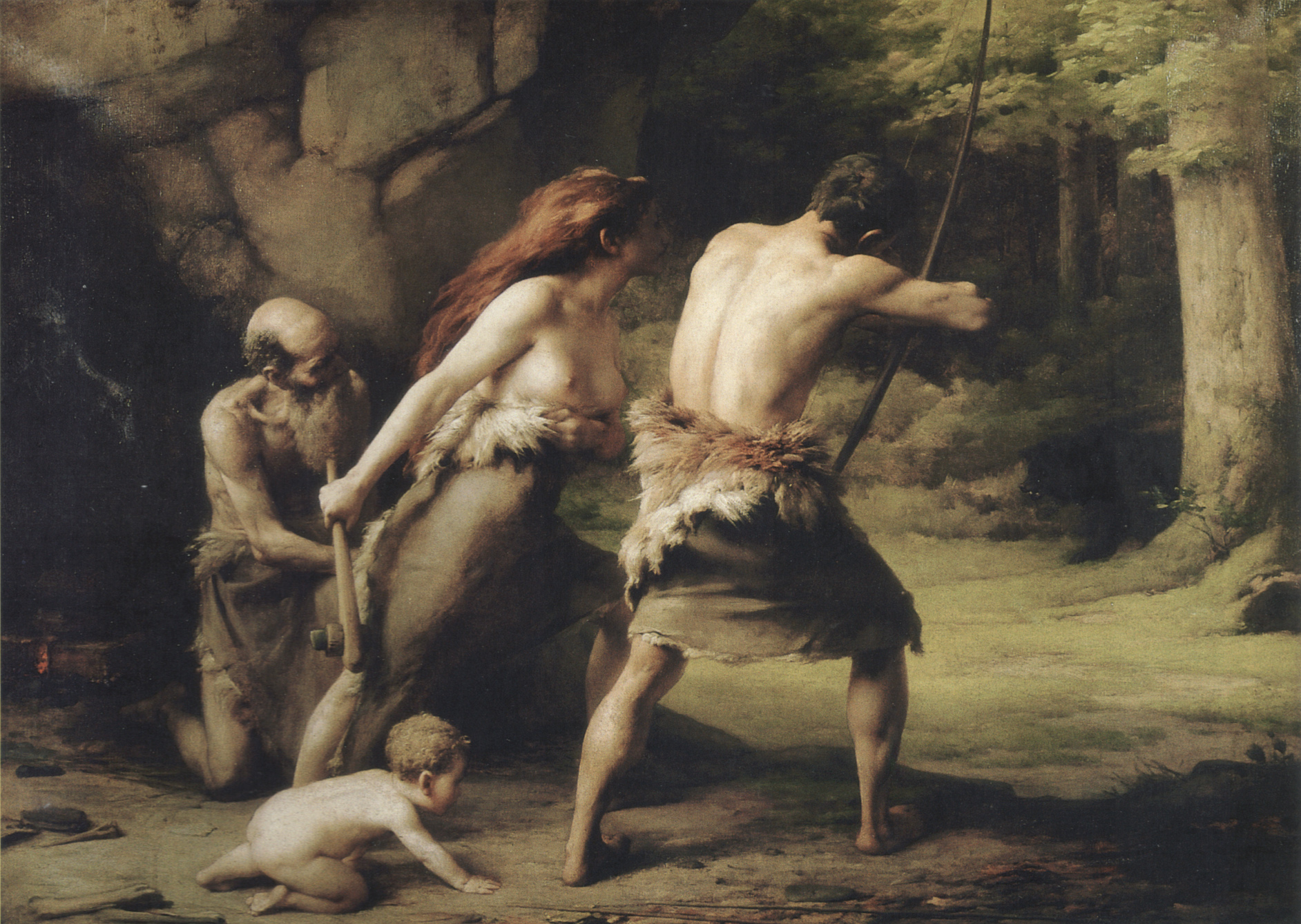
Emmanuel Benner, A Family in the Stone Age

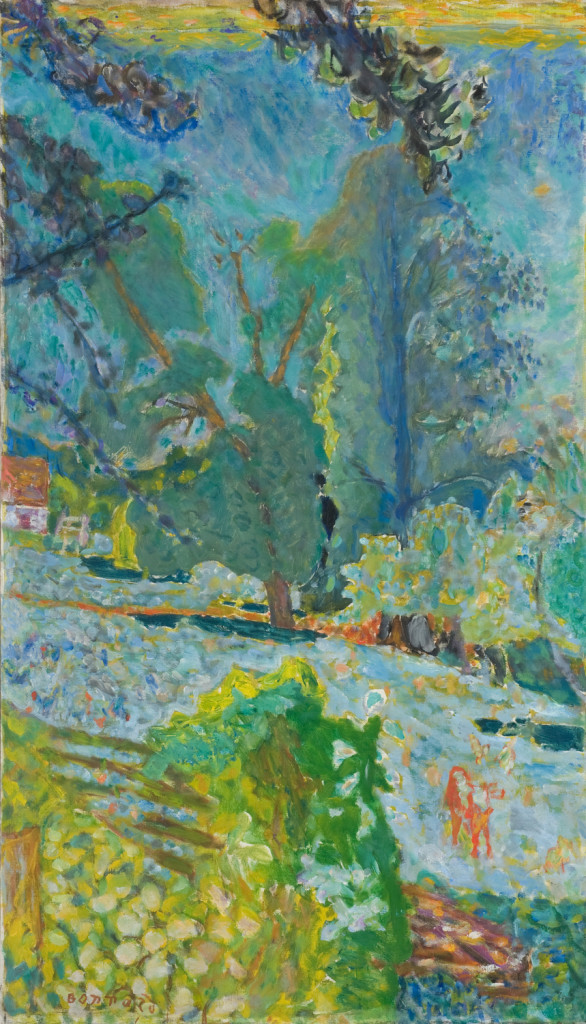
Pierre Bonnard, Normand Landscape

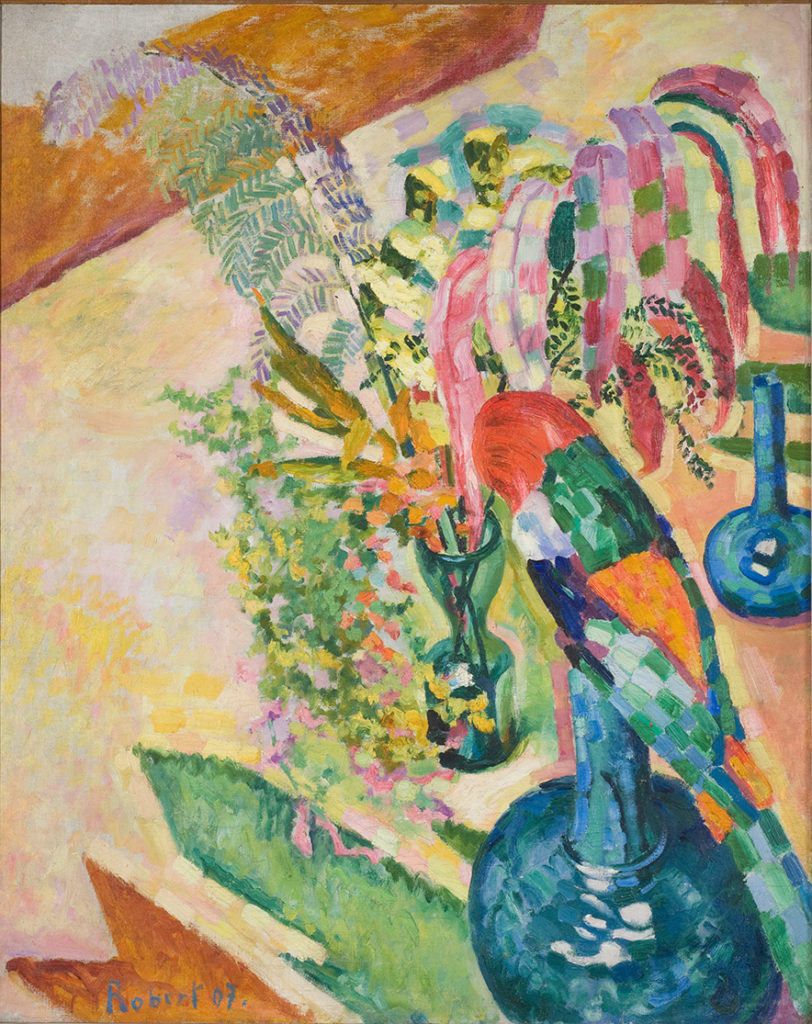
Robert Delaunay, Still Life with a Parrot

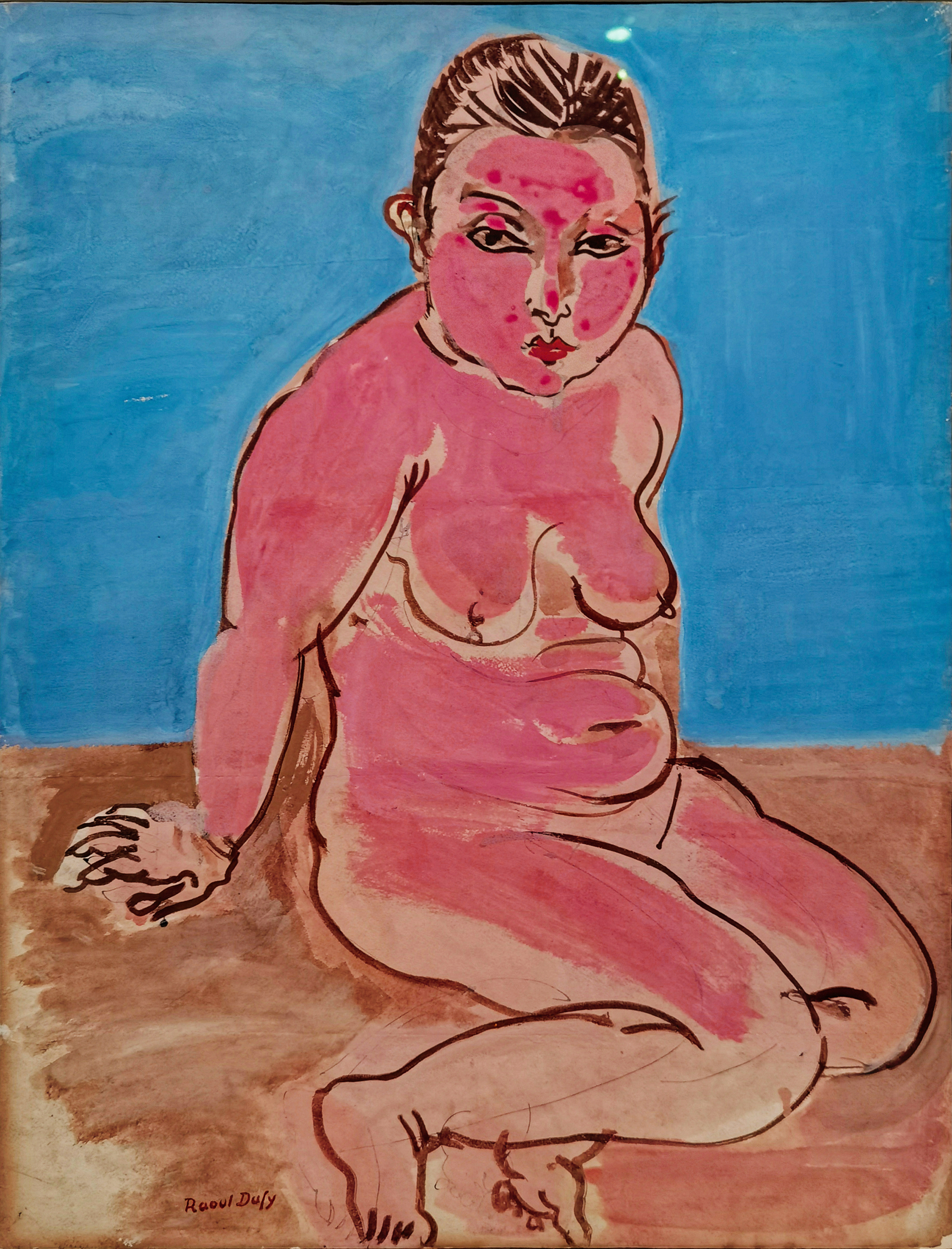
Raoul Dufy, Pink Nude

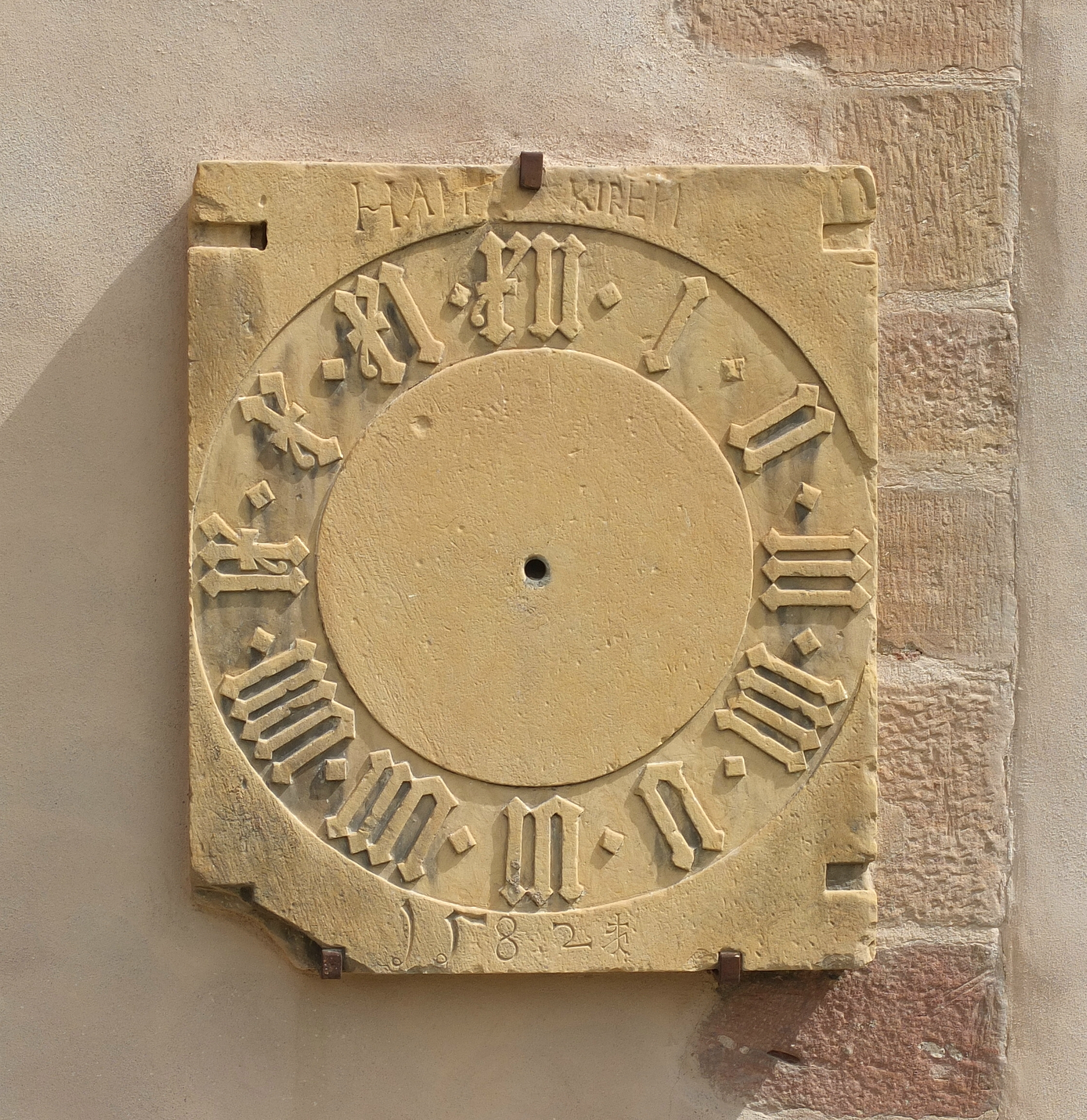
Clock face (1582)

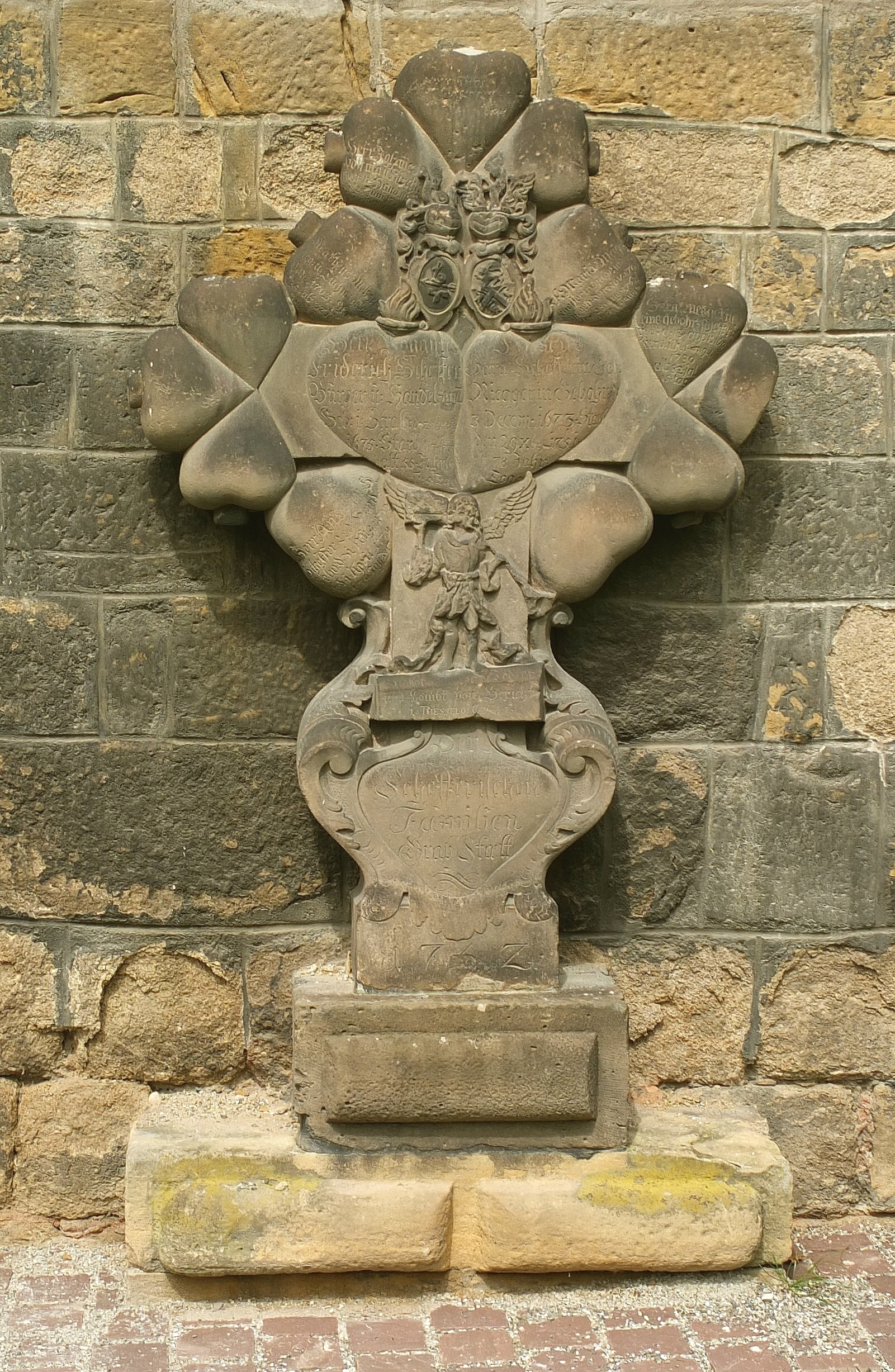
Commemorative cross (1762)

== Bibliography ==
- Le musée Unterlinden – Guide des collections, Magali Haas, Éditions Artlys, Paris, 2016. ISBN 978-2-85495-625-2
- La collection d'art moderne – Le Musée Unterlinden de Alechinsky à Zack, Frédérique Goerig-Hergott, Éditions Artlys, Paris, 2015. ISBN 978-2-85495-627-6
- Le Musée Unterlinden de Colmar, Sylvie Lecoq-Ramond & Pantxika Béguerie, Éditions Albin Michel, Paris, 1991. ISBN 2-226-05411-1
