= Trees in L'Estaque =

Painting by Raoul Dufy

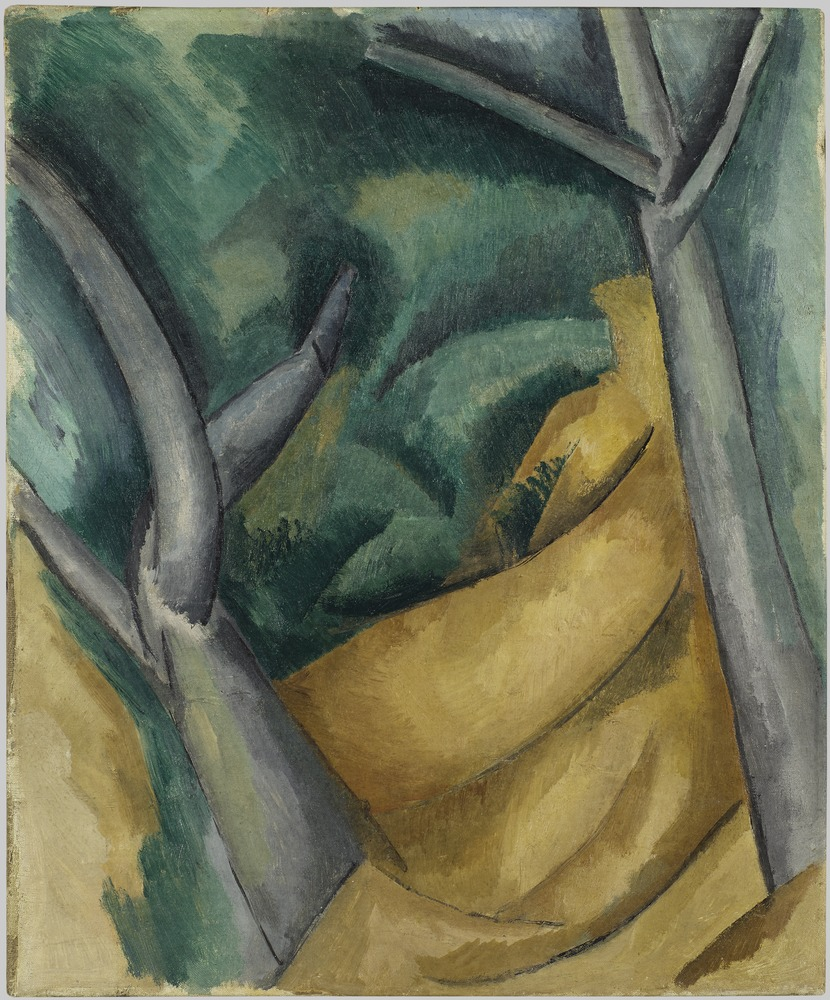
Trees in L'Estaque (1908) by Raoul Dufy

Trees in L'Estaque is an oil on canvas painting by French painter Raoul Dufy, from 1908. It is owned by the Musée national d'Art moderne, in Paris, but placed on loan to the Musée Cantini since 1987. It is a cubist painting.
