= Stetter =

Stetter is a German surname. Notable people with the surname include:

- Florian Stetter (born 1977), German actor
- Georg Stetter (1895–1988), Austrian-German nuclear physicist
- George Stetter (born 1945), American player of Canadian football
- Hans Stetter (1927–2019), German actor
- Hans Jörg Stetter (1930–2025), German mathematician
- Karl Stetter (born 1941), German scientist
- Mitch Stetter (born 1981), American baseball player
- Stephan Stetter (born 1972), German politic scientist
- Wilhelm Stetter (1487−1552), Alsatian painter

== See also ==
- Dora Koch-Stetter (1881–1968), German artist
- Stetter reaction, a reaction in organic chemistry
