= STET Homeland Security Services =

Security consultancy firm based in Singapore

STET Homeland Security Services Pte. Ltd.
- Native name
- Traditional Chinese: 新科国土安防公司
- Formerly: STET Homeland Security (2005–2009)
- Type: Division
- Industry: Security
- Founded: 2005; 21 years ago
- Founder: ST Education and Training
- Headquarters: Singapore
- Parent: Singapore Technologies Electronics Limited

STET Homeland Security Services (Chinese: 新科国土安防公司), formerly STET Homeland Security, is a security consultancy firm based in Singapore. It was founded in 2005 and is a company of Singapore Technologies Electronics Limited (ST Electronics). ST Electronics is a company of ST Engineering which is listed on the Singapore Exchange. STET Homeland Security Services is one of the major security firms, such as Certis CISCO (the largest Auxiliary Police Force in Singapore having close to 4,000 armed officers), Aetos Security Management, Sinclair Knight Merz and Heierli Consulting Engineers, that are active in Singapore. It specializes in security consultancy and does not provide manpower.

== History ==
The firm began operations in 2005 as STET Homeland Security, a business unit of its parent company ST Education and Training (STET) whose core businesses include defence, maritime and education. It was housed at HarbourFront Centre until 2007 when it moved to the Holiday Inn Atrium on Outram Road. On 8 March 2009, it was incorporated as a subsidiary of STET and renamed STET Homeland Security Services Pte. Ltd. It is also known by its abbreviated name STET HLS.

== Organization ==
=== Board of directors ===
Current members of the Board of Directors are:

- Baey Yam Keng, Member of Parliament for Tanjong Pagar GRC (Singapore)
- Professor Rohan Gunaratna, Head of the International Centre for Political Violence and Terrorism Research, Nanyang Technological University
- Angela Low, Director of Legal & Business Excellence in ST Electronics (Training & Simulation Systems)
- Michael Chen, Group CEO of STET

=== Business Divisions ===
- Consultancy - Security master planning, audit and study, planning and design, structural resilience study, tender documentation and evaluation, project management
- Security engineering solutions – Turnkey, design, supply and install, supply of equipment, protective solutions design
- Security training

== Security Role in Singapore ==
=== Emerging Security Requirements ===
Following a series of terror attacks across the world in the last two decades, the general security consciousness was heightened worldwide. The Ministry of Home Affairs, Singapore, published the “Enhancing Building Security” in April 2005 followed by a revised version "Guidelines for Enhancing Building Security in January 2010. In line with the general security climate worldwide, security planning by security consultants such as STET HLS became increasingly important.

=== Security Training ===
While the company does not provide manpower, it provides training for security personnel from the operational to senior management levels. Its programs are conducted with partners such as the ASIS International (Singapore Chapter) and the NUS Extension (NEX).

== Defined Overseas Markets ==
Since the Prime Minister of Singapore, Mr. Goh Chok Tong, initiated a series of high-level visits to the Middle East in 2004, Singapore’s diplomatic and economic presence in the region increased. Today, there are about 50 Singaporeans working in Oman and 250 in Bahrain. In line with the business climate, STET HLS entered the Middle East market in 2005.

=== Qatar ===
The company started making inroads in the Gulf region in 2005 by providing security master planning in various sectors such as healthcare, finance and education. It was believed that Qatar was a good base for Singapore firms due to similarities between the two countries. A branch office of ST Electronics was established in Qatar in 2007. Singapore’s strong branding in Qatar helped to provide a good position. According to a news source in the Middle East, STET HLS was acknowledged by industry players as frontrunners in the field of ports and airport security in the emirate.

=== Oman ===
After the beginning of a relationship with the Central Bank of Oman (CBO) in 2007, STET HLS was awarded a security solutions project in 2009 valued at about S$7m. As part of security-enhancement efforts, the CBO organized an awareness seminar in January 2010 in collaboration with STET HLS. In 2010, a branch office was established in Oman to maintain presence for projects and business development.

== Corporate Social Responsibility (CSR) ==
STET HLS is a member of the Singapore Compact, an initiative offshoot from the United Nations Global Compact (UNCG) and a national society in promoting CSR in Singapore. The company works with various organizations to bring security awareness and advice to both the commercial and public sectors.
