= Wilhelm Stetter =

German painter

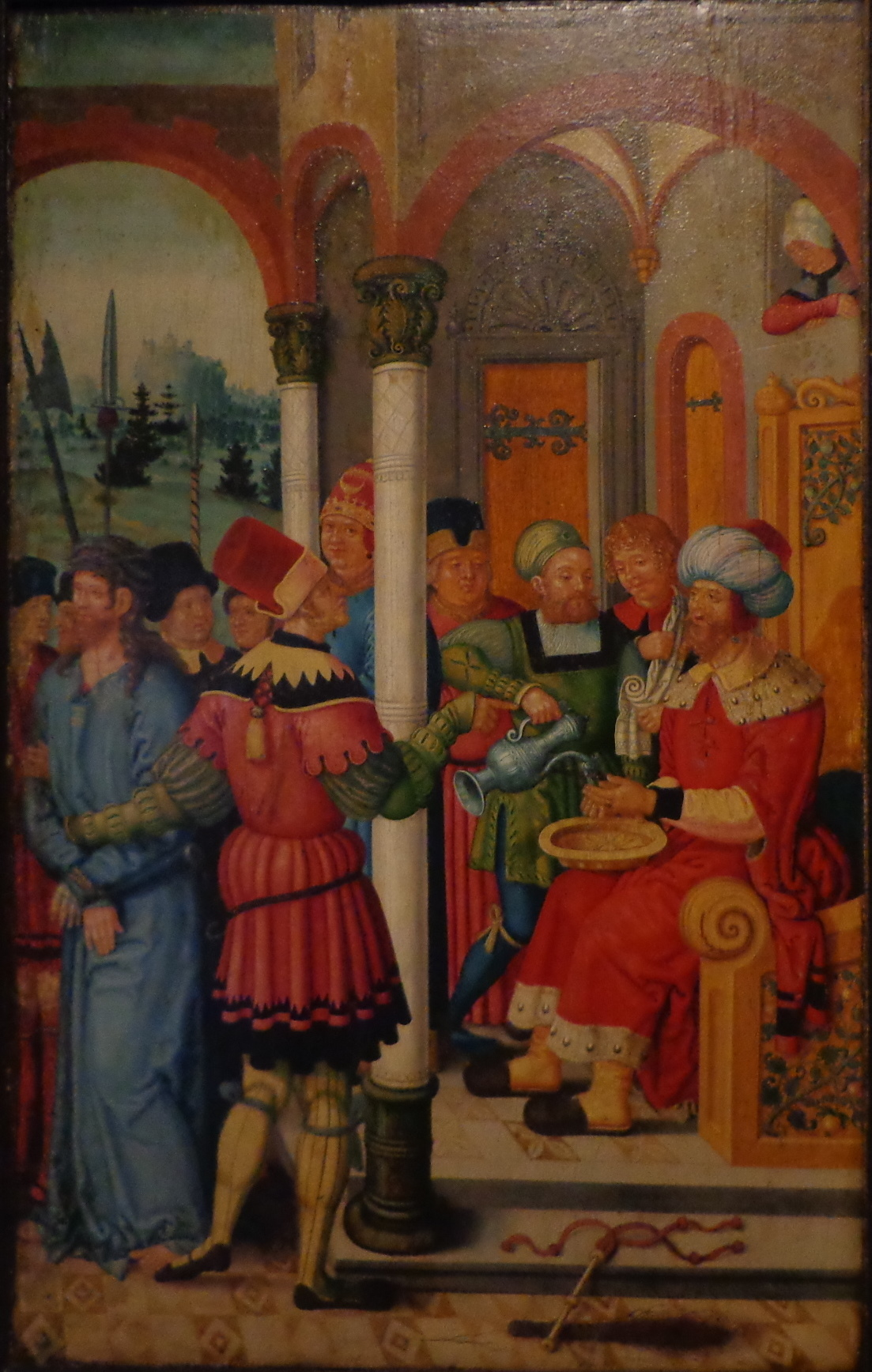
Christ before Pilatus, 1535 (Musée de l’Œuvre Notre-Dame, Strasbourg )

Wilhelm Stetter (1487–1552) was a German Renaissance painter from Alsace. He was born and died in Strasbourg.

Stetter was long known by the notname Master W. S. with the Maltese cross until he was identified in 1952 by the scholar Jean Rott (1911–1998). As well as a painter, stylistically influenced by Hans Baldung and Albrecht Dürer, Stetter was a member of the Order of Saint John since 1510 (first as an acolyte, then ordained as a priest in 1512).

Works by Stetter are on display in the Musée de l’Œuvre Notre-Dame in his hometown, in the Unterlinden Museum in Colmar, in the Walters Art Museum in Baltimore, in the Germanisches Nationalmuseum in Nuremberg, in the Wallraf-Richartz Museum in Cologne and the Musée des Beaux-Arts in Nancy.
