= Madonna of the Rose Bower (Schongauer) =

Painting by Martin Schongauer

- French: La Vierge au buisson de roses, German: Madonna im Rosenhag
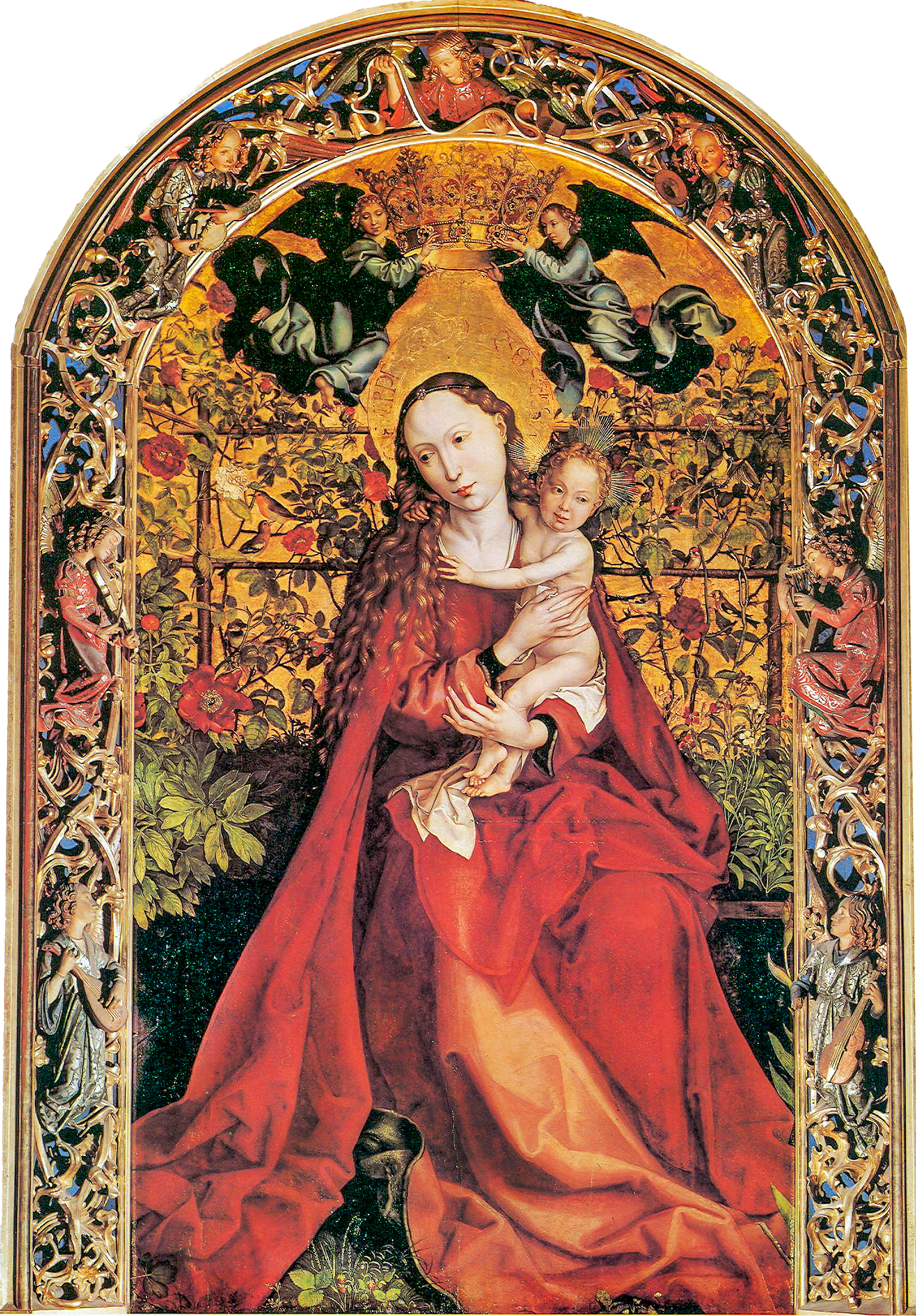
- Artist: Martin Schongauer
- Year: 1473
- Medium: oil paint on panel
- Movement: International Gothic; Northern Renaissance
- Subject: Mary and Christ Child in a hortus conclusus
- Dimensions: 200 cm × 114.5 cm (79 in × 45.1 in)
- Location: Dominican Church, Colmar

Madonna of the Rose Bower (French: La Vierge au buisson de roses) is a monumental 1473 panel painting by the German artist Martin Schongauer, depicting Mary and Christ Child in a hortus conclusus, surrounded by roses and finches. The painting is kept in the former Dominican Church of Colmar in Alsace, a large Gothic church formerly of the Dominican Order, built in the 13th and 14th century. It is classified as a Monument historique, as an object, by the French Ministry of Culture since 1978.

Madonna of the Rose Bower was painted in 1473 as a reredos for St Martin's Church, Colmar's largest Christian sanctuary, and stood there until it was stolen in January 1972. After the painting was recovered in June 1973, it was moved to its present location, in the choir of the former Dominican church. In 1480, Schongauer and his assistants had also painted a monumental polyptych for that church; this work (Retable des Dominicains), which has only partially survived, is today kept in the Unterlinden Museum.

The theme and the general composition present similarities with Stefan Lochner's earlier and much smaller Madonna of the Rose Bower, while the appearance of the Virgin is modelled on Rogier van der Weyden's Saint Columba Altarpiece; apart from being life-sized and clad in red instead of blue, Schongauer's Virgin has however a markedly different facial expression than Van der Weyden's. The current Gothic Revival frame of the painting is a work by the sculptor Jacques Alfred Klem (1872–1948).

A small 16th-century copy of Schongauer's painting, which is today kept in the Isabella Stewart Gardner Museum of Boston, Massachusetts, shows the original state of the Madonna of the Rose Bower before it was cut down on all sides at an unknown date. It initially measured about 250 cm (98 in) by 165 cm (65 in) – by comparison, Lochner's painting measures only 50.5 cm (19.9 in) by 40 cm (16 in).
