= Thoman Burgkmair =

German painter

- Thoman Burgkmair
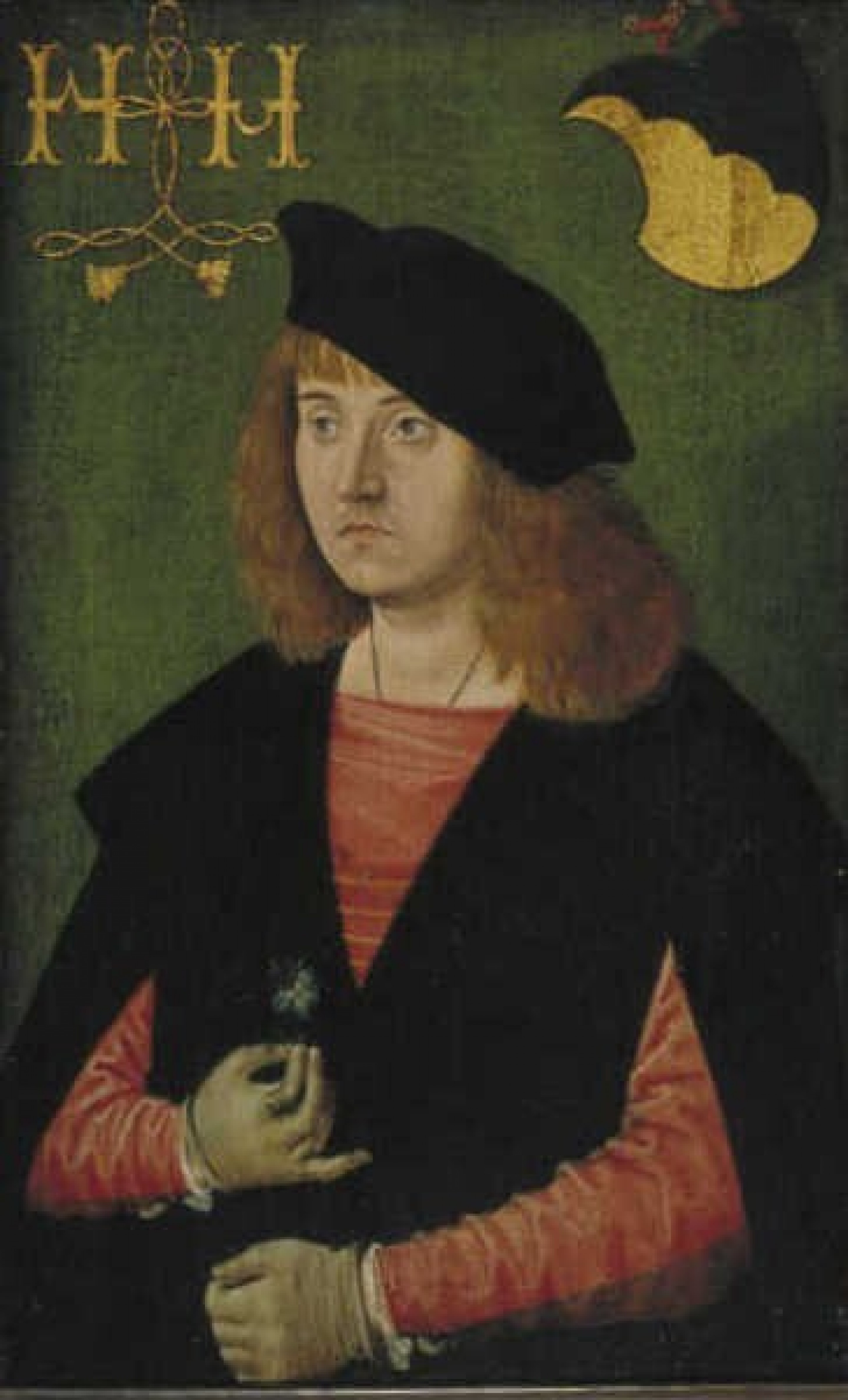
- Portrait by Hans Höchstätter, circa 1495
- Born: Thoman Burgkmair c. 1444; Augsburg (free imperial city), Holy Roman Empire
- Died: 1523 (aged 78–79); Augsburg (free imperial city), Holy Roman Empire
- Movement: Late Gothic

Thoman Burgkmair, or Thomas Burgkmair (died 1523) was a German painter.

== Life ==
The father of Hans Burgkmair, and the father-in-law of Hans Holbein the elder, he is mentioned in the records of the Painters' Guild at Augsburg in 1460, and in public documents there in 1479. In 1480 he painted a Christ with St. Ulric and a Virgin with St. Elizabeth of Thuringia, both in the cathedral at Augsburg; the gallery of that city also possesses a picture by him of the Martyrdom of St. Stephen, St. Lawrence, and scenes from the Passion. Burgkmair died at Augsburg in 1523.

== Gallery ==
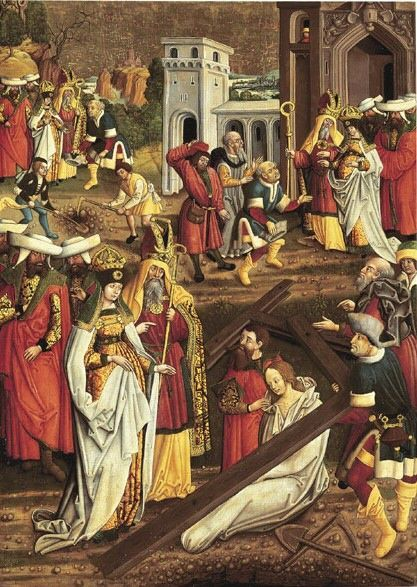
Finding of the cross by Empress Helena

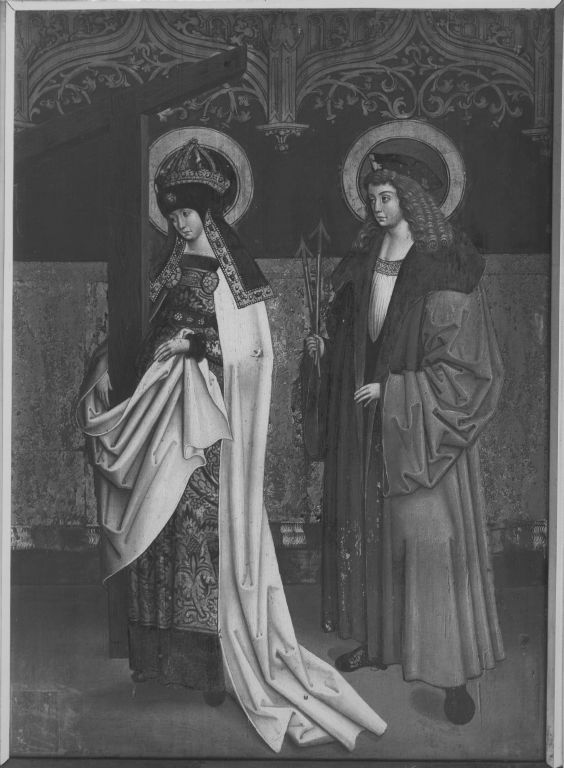
Saint Helena and Saint Sebastian

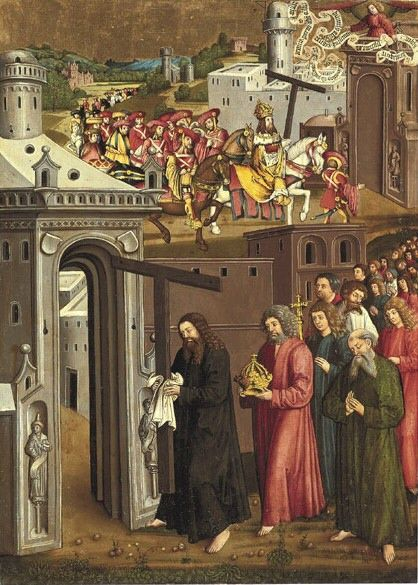
Emperor Heraclius carries the cross

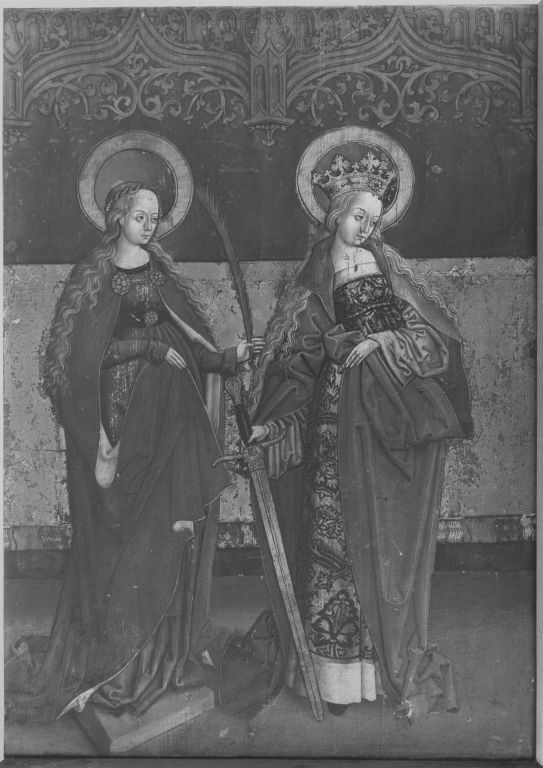
Saint Catherine and Saint Barbara

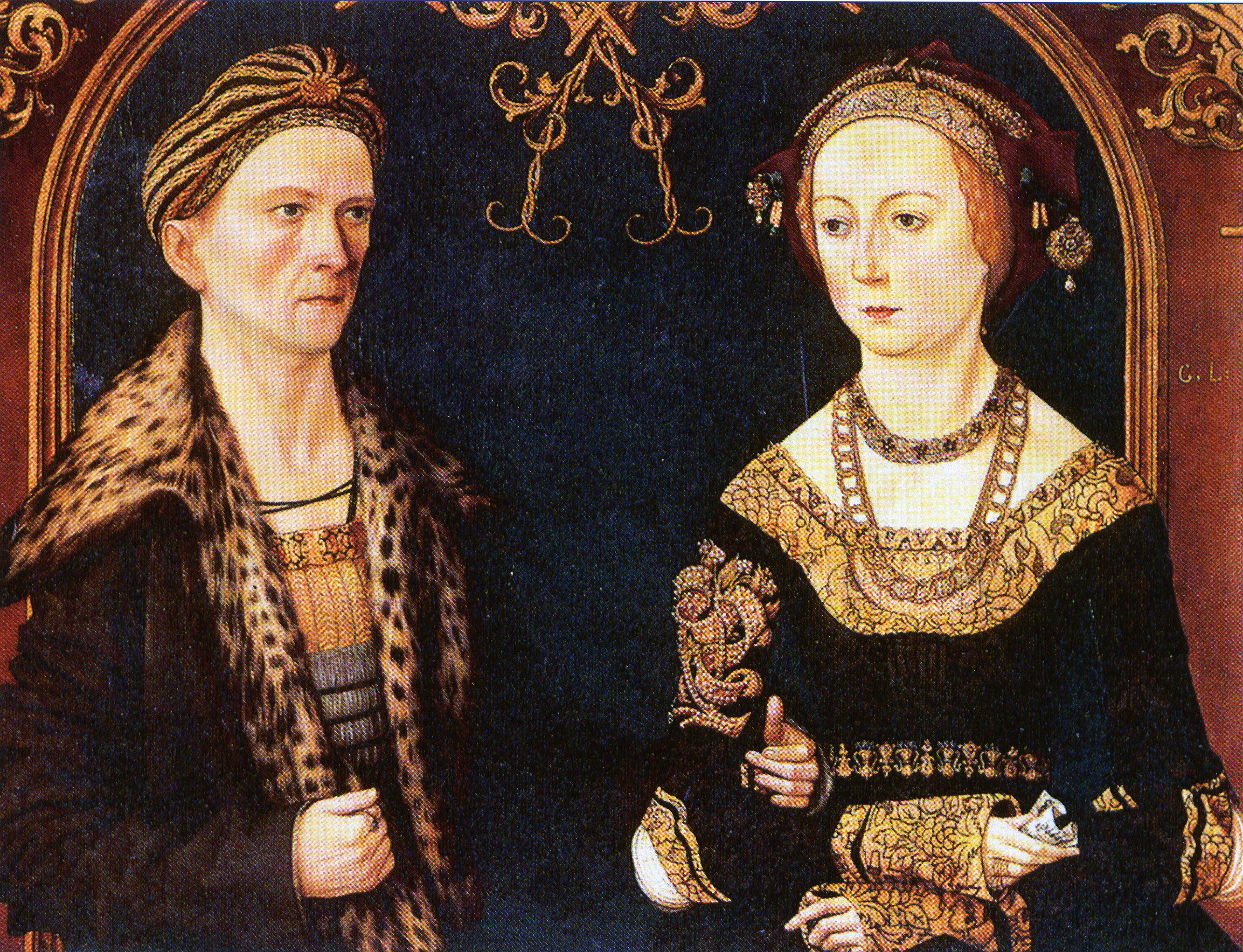
Jakob Fugger and Sybille Artzt
