= Ingersheim, Haut-Rhin =

Commune in Grand Est, France

Ingersheim
- Commune
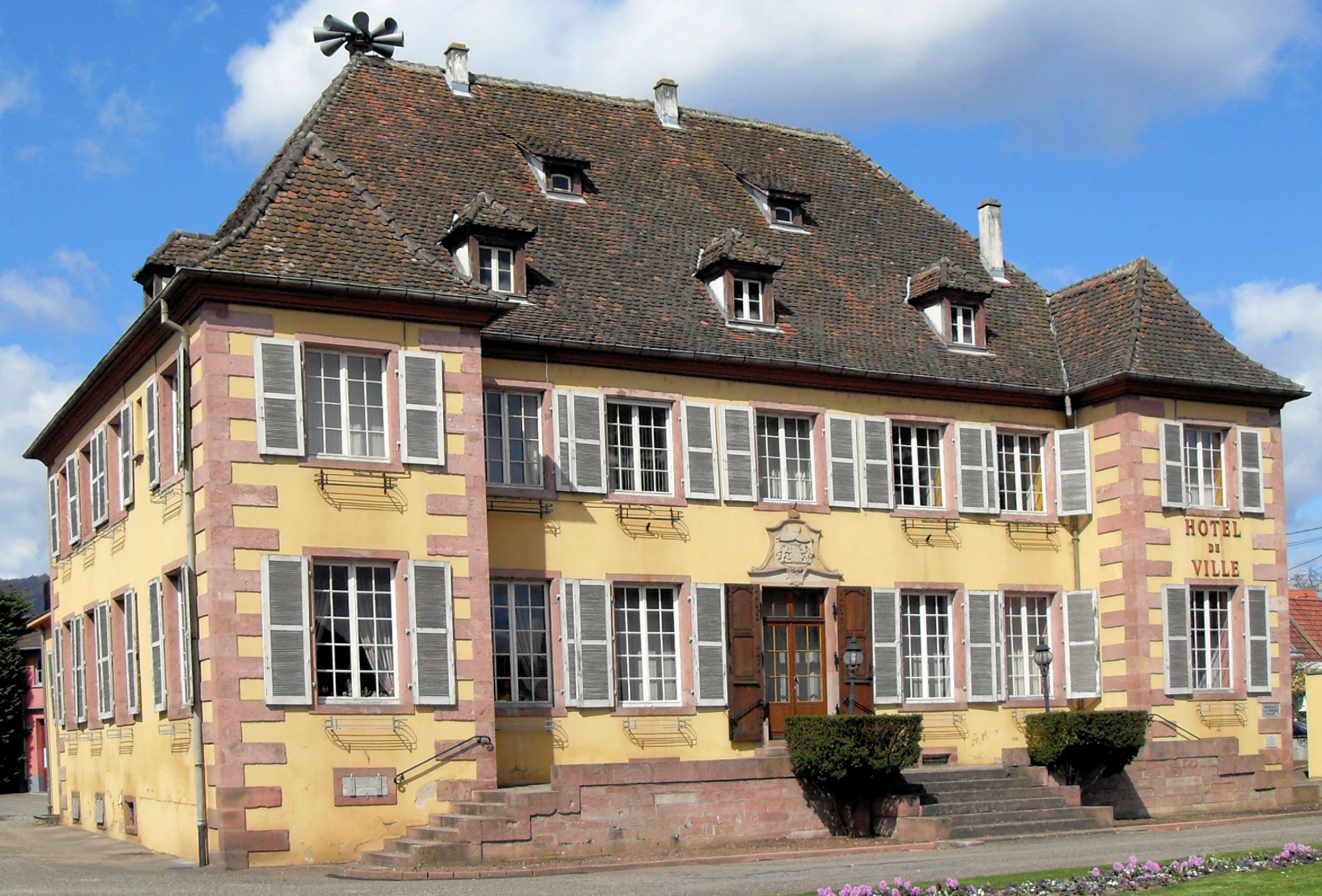
- The town hall in Ingersheim

- Coat of arms
- Location of Ingersheim
- Location within France Location within Grand Est
- Coordinates: 48°05′43″N 7°18′25″E
- Country: France
- Region: Grand Est
- Department: Haut-Rhin
- Arrondissement: Colmar-Ribeauvillé
- Canton: Colmar-1
- Intercommunality: Colmar Agglomération

Government
  - Mayor (2020–2026): Denise Stoeckle
- Area^{1}: 7.44 km^{2} (2.87 sq mi)
- Elevation: 215 m (705 ft)
- Highest elevation: 326 m (1,070 ft)
- Lowest elevation: 196 m (643 ft)
- Population (2023): 4,774
  - Density: 642/km^{2} (1,660/sq mi)
- Time zone: UTC+01:00 (CET)
  - Summer (DST): UTC+02:00 (CEST)
- INSEE/Postal code: 68155 /68040
- ^{1} French Land Register data, which excludes lakes, ponds, glaciers > 1 km^{2} (0.386 sq mi or 247 acres) and river estuaries.

Ingersheim (French pronunciation: [iŋ(ɡ)əʁsaim]) is a commune in the Haut-Rhin department in Grand Est in north-eastern France. It is located near Colmar.

== Population ==
Historical population
Year	Pop.	±% p.a.
1968	3,636	—
1975	4,466	+2.98%
1982	4,271	−0.64%
1990	4,063	−0.62%
1999	4,170	+0.29%
2007	4,583	+1.19%
2012	4,621	+0.17%
2017	4,678	+0.25%
2023	4,774	+0.34%
Source: INSEE

== See also ==
- Communes of the Haut-Rhin département
