= Lycée Camille Sée =

Lycée Camille Sée may refer to:

- Lycée Camille-Sée in Paris
- Lycée Camille Sée in Colmar
