= Jean-Pierre Muller =

Jean-Pierre Muller may refer to:

- Jean-Pierre Muller (fencer) (1924-2008), a French fencer
- Jean-Pierre Muller (cyclist) (1910-1948), a Luxembourgian cyclist
