= Friedrich Staps =

Attempted assassin of Napoleon (1792–1809)

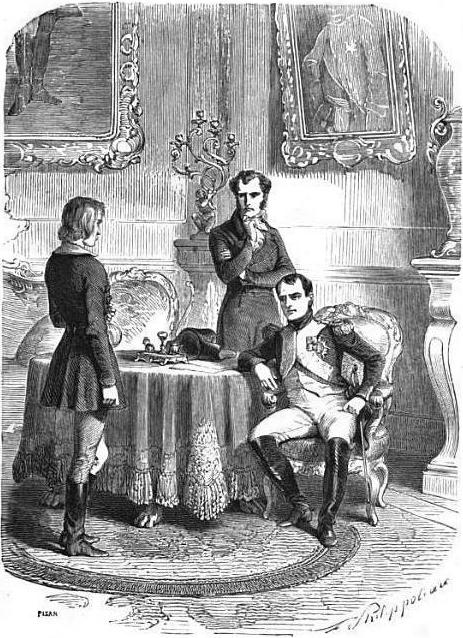
Interrogatoire de Staps par Napoléon (Interrogation of Staps by Napoleon)

Friedrich Staps (also, Stapß; 14 March 1792 – 17 October 1809) attempted to assassinate Napoleon during the negotiations at Schönbrunn.

== Biography ==
He was a son of a pastor and became a merchant, working at Erfurt and Leipzig. As a strictly religious young man, he saw Napoleon's occupation as the sole reason for the misery of the German people, and thus became his opponent.

He set out to assassinate Napoleon, going first to Vienna, and, from there, on 13 October, to Schönbrunn, where Napoleon was to observe a military parade. Staps approached Napoleon on the pretense of presenting him with a petition, but was refused. One of Napoleon's aides, General Rapp, became suspicious of the young man, whose right hand was thrust into a pocket under his coat. Staps was arrested and found to be carrying a large carving knife. When Rapp asked whether he had planned to assassinate Napoleon, Staps answered in the affirmative.

Napoleon wanted to speak to Staps directly, so the prisoner was brought to the Emperor's office with his hands tied behind his back. Using Rapp as an interpreter, Napoleon asked Staps a series of questions.

‘Where were you born?’ – ‘In Naumburg.’

‘What is your father?’ – ‘A Protestant minister.’

‘How old are you?’ – ‘I am eighteen years of age.’

‘What did you intend to do with the knife?’ – ‘To kill you.’

‘You are mad, young man; you are an illuminato.’ – ‘I am not mad; and I know not what is meant by an illuminato.’

‘You are sick, then.’ – ‘I am not sick; on the contrary, I am in good health.’

‘Why did you wish to assassinate me?’ – ‘Because you have caused the misfortunes of my country.’

‘Have I done you any harm?’ – ‘You have done harm to me as well as to all Germans.’

‘By whom were you sent? Who instigated you to this crime?’ – ‘Nobody. I determined to take your life from the conviction that I should thereby render the highest service to my country and to Europe.’ …

‘I tell you, you are either mad or sick.’ – ‘Neither the one nor the other.’

After a doctor examined Staps and pronounced him in good health, Napoleon offered the young man a chance for clemency.

‘You are a wild enthusiast, you will ruin your family. I am willing to grant your life, if you ask pardon for the crime which you intended to commit, and for which you ought to be sorry.’ – ‘I want no pardon. I feel the deepest regret for not having executed my design.’

‘You seem to think very lightly of the commission of a crime!’ – ‘To kill you would not have been a crime but a duty.’ …

‘Would you not be grateful were I to pardon you?’ – ‘I would notwithstanding seize the first opportunity of taking your life.’

Staps was executed by a firing squad on October 17, 1809. His last words were: “Liberty forever! Germany forever! Death to the tyrant!”

== See also ==
- Treaty of Schönbrunn
