= Ladhof Stadium =

Football stadium in Colmar, France

Stade du Ladhof
- Location within France
- Address: 2, rue du Ladhof, 68000 Colmar, France
- Coordinates: 48.082°N 7.366°E
- Capacity: 1500 places

Tenants
- FC Portugais de Colmar, FC Espagnols de Colmar

The Stadium Ladhof is a stadium in Colmar, France particularly known for hosting the matches of Football Club of Colmar (known for a time as Colmar Stadium 77) until 1986. It is currently used by the Portuguese FC and FC Colmar Spaniards, two regional amateur clubs.

The stadium has a capacity of 1,500 seats, including 240 seats in the assises.

It is located on 2 Ladhof Street, Colmar. It should not be confused with Francs stadium or the Colmar Stadium, the other two main stadiums in the city.

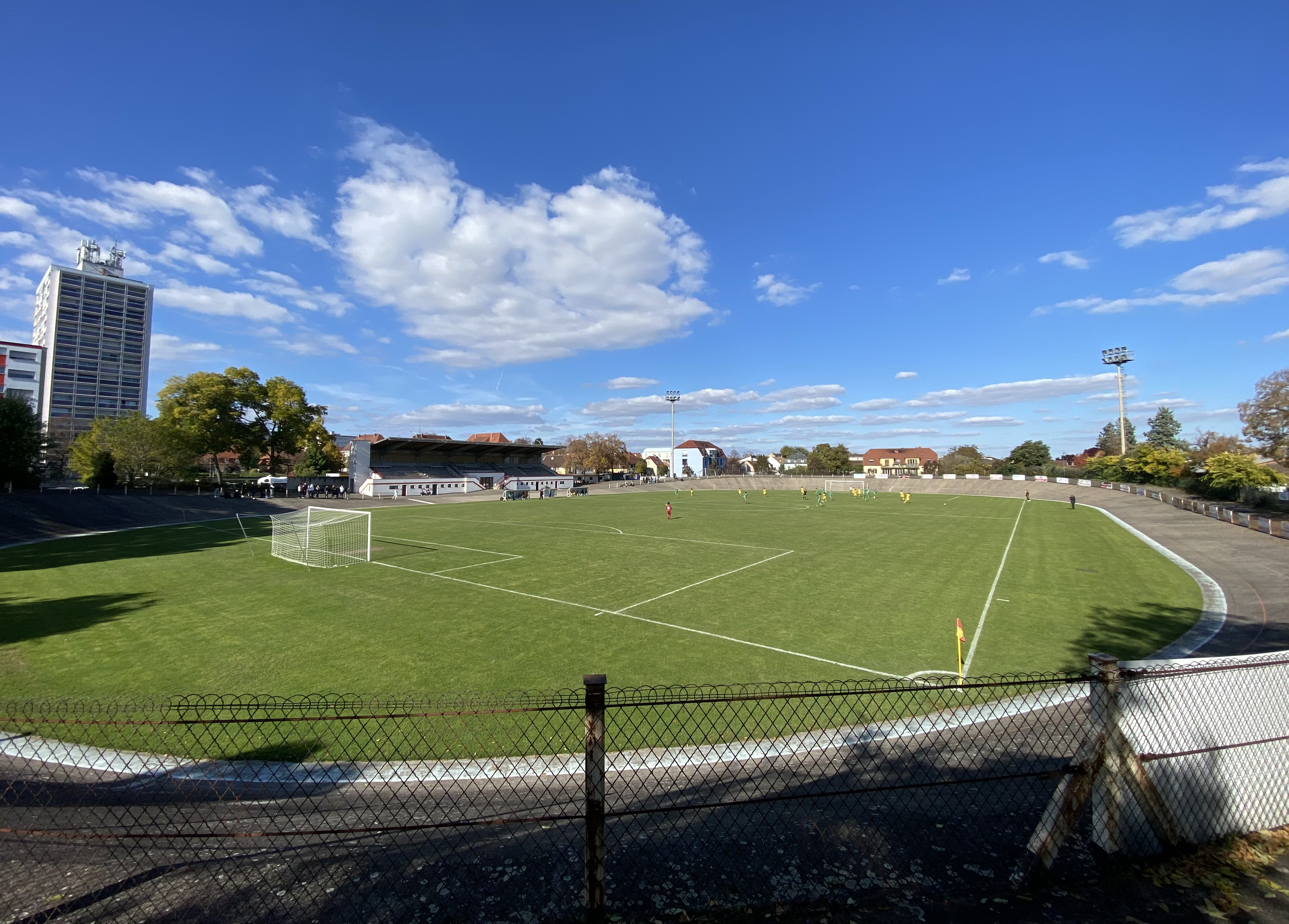
The stadium on October 18, 2025.

== History ==
The stadium was inaugurated on 21 September 1947. From that date, it hosts the home games of FC Colmar, becoming Colmar Stadium 77 in 1977. There will be played encounters of CFA in 1948–1949, of Division 3 soccer in 1978–1979, and Division 4 soccer in 1979–1980.

On 26 December 1964 FC Colmar played FC Sochauxin at Ladhof Stadium.

After the dissolution of Colmar Stadium 77 in 1986, the stadium was occupied by small amateur clubs in Colmar.

== World record by scooter ==
On 30 May 2006 The Colmarien Pascal Couffin beat the world hour record for the kick scooter at the Ladhof Stadium. In all, he traveled 17 kilometers and 188 meters.

On 16 September 2012, again in Ladhof Stadium, Pascal tried to beat his own record, in vain.

== See also ==
=== Bibliography ===
Here is a list of some reference books on the subject. Those used in the writing of this article are pointed by the symbol †

- collectif (2002), "Football Club Colmar", in Ligue d'Alsace de Football Association (ed.), 100 ans de football en Alsace, Edito, ISBN 2911219139, LAFA †
- Francis Braesch (1989), Ligue d'Alsace de Football Association (ed.), Grandes et petites histoires du football alsacien, Ligue d'Alsace de Football, ISBN 9782950426901

=== External links ===
- "Stade du Ladhof".
- "Stade du Ladhof (Colmar)".
