= Hans Loewald =

German psychoanalyst and theorist (1906–1993)

- Born: 19 January 1906; Colmar, German Empire
- Died: 9 January 1993 (aged 86); Hamden, Connecticut, U.S.
- Scientific career
- Fields: Psychiatry, psychoanalysis

Hans Loewald (German: [ˈhans ˈløːvalt]; 19 January 1906 – 9 January 1993) was a German-American psychoanalyst and theorist. While apparently a traditional Freudian, Loewald in his thinking was both elegant and quietly revisionist – a radical conservative .

== Background and education ==
Loewald was born in Colmar, then Germany. His father, who died shortly after his birth, was a Jewish physician with an interest in dermatology and psychiatry; his mother was a gifted musician, who played the piano. Loewald did medical training in Germany – where he also studied philosophy with Martin Heidegger, who would influence him with his theory of language – before taking a medical degree from Rome University in 1935. He practiced psychiatry in Italy until 1939, before moving with his family to the United States. There he became fascinated by Sigmund Freud's theory, in which he rooted all the features of his own thinking. He did not want to create a new psychoanalytic terminology, but, although he used Freud's terms, he gave them radically new meanings.

== Language ==
Loewald approached language from a perspective that is unique among analytic theorists. Unlike Harry Stack Sullivan, Daniel Stern, and Freud, whose understanding of language included a sharp distinction between verbal and preverbal expressions, Loewald states that verbal and preverbal expressions are a form of sensory experience.

He distinguishes between the primary process in which the child experiences only sounds (fantasy), and the secondary process, in which the child gives meaning to these sounds (reality).

Psychopathology is caused by a split between these processes, between fantasy and reality. Mental health entails an open communication and interpenetration between the primary and the secondary process.

== Transference, identification, and the Oedipus complex ==
Loewald described the experience of the transference as comparable to "an illness, insofar as it is a regressive and unsettling experience, not dissimilar to...the state of being in love". However he considered the ultimate end of analysis the integration of that interior, regressed self into the everyday external world.

Drawing on the work of Melanie Klein to integrate pre-oedipal and oedipal phases, Loewald saw internalization, when successful, as leading to complete detachment from the original object. Loewald's under-appreciated work on aesthetics and symbolism reflects this Kleinian orientation of bridging the pre-oedipal (paranoid-schizoid) with the oedipal (depressive position) era.

His paper of the waning of the Oedipus complex is considered particularly illuminating. Both Loewald and Freud considered guilt at the wish to murder or harm the same-sex parent to be one of the driving forces behind the organization of the self. Freud saw guilt as something that should be evaded, Loewald regarded it as something that had to be worked through to complete the individuation process - the passing of the baton from one generation to the next. In Loewald's view the resolution of the Oedipus complex involved symbolic destruction of the parents as libidinal objects [cite]. Loewald, contrary to Freud, saw the parents as complementary with both advantages and disadvantages of their own. The mother fulfills all the wishes of the child but in doing so she leaves no room for the child's autonomy. The father presents autonomy to the child and thus protects the child from engulfment by the mother, which could lead to ego loss. The task of ego development is to integrate both parts..

Loewald also wrote a study of the Freud-Jung relationship titled 'Transference and Counter-Transference'.

== See also ==
- Eros
- Jonathan Lear
- Kiekegaard
