= Treaty of Schönbrunn =

Peace treaty between France and Austria signed on 14 October 1809

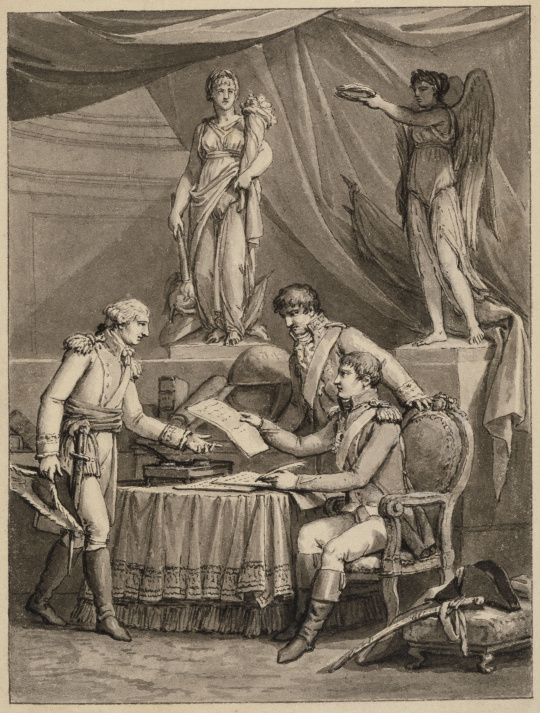
Peace treaty concluded at Vienna on 14 October 1809, by Charles Monnet

The Treaty of Schönbrunn (French: Traité de Schönbrunn), sometimes known as the Peace of Schönbrunn (German: Friede von Schönbrunn) or the Treaty of Vienna (German: Wiener Frieden), was signed between France and Austria at Schönbrunn Palace near Vienna on 14 October 1809. The treaty ended the Fifth Coalition during the Napoleonic Wars, after Austria had been defeated at the decisive Battle of Wagram on 5–6 July.

== Prelude ==
During the Peninsular War and the Spanish resistance against Napoleon, Austria had tried to reverse the 1805 Peace of Pressburg by sparking national uprisings in the French-occupied territories of Central Europe (most notably the Tyrolean Rebellion against Napoleon's Bavarian allies).

These attempts ultimately failed, after French forces occupied Vienna in May 1809. The Austrians under Archduke Charles were able to repulse them at the Battle of Aspern on 21–22 May; however, Napoleon withdrew his forces and crushed Charles' army at Wagram a few weeks later. The archduke had to sign the Armistice of Znaim on 12 July. In October, Austrian Foreign Minister Johann Philipp Stadion was superseded by Klemens von Metternich.

== Terms ==
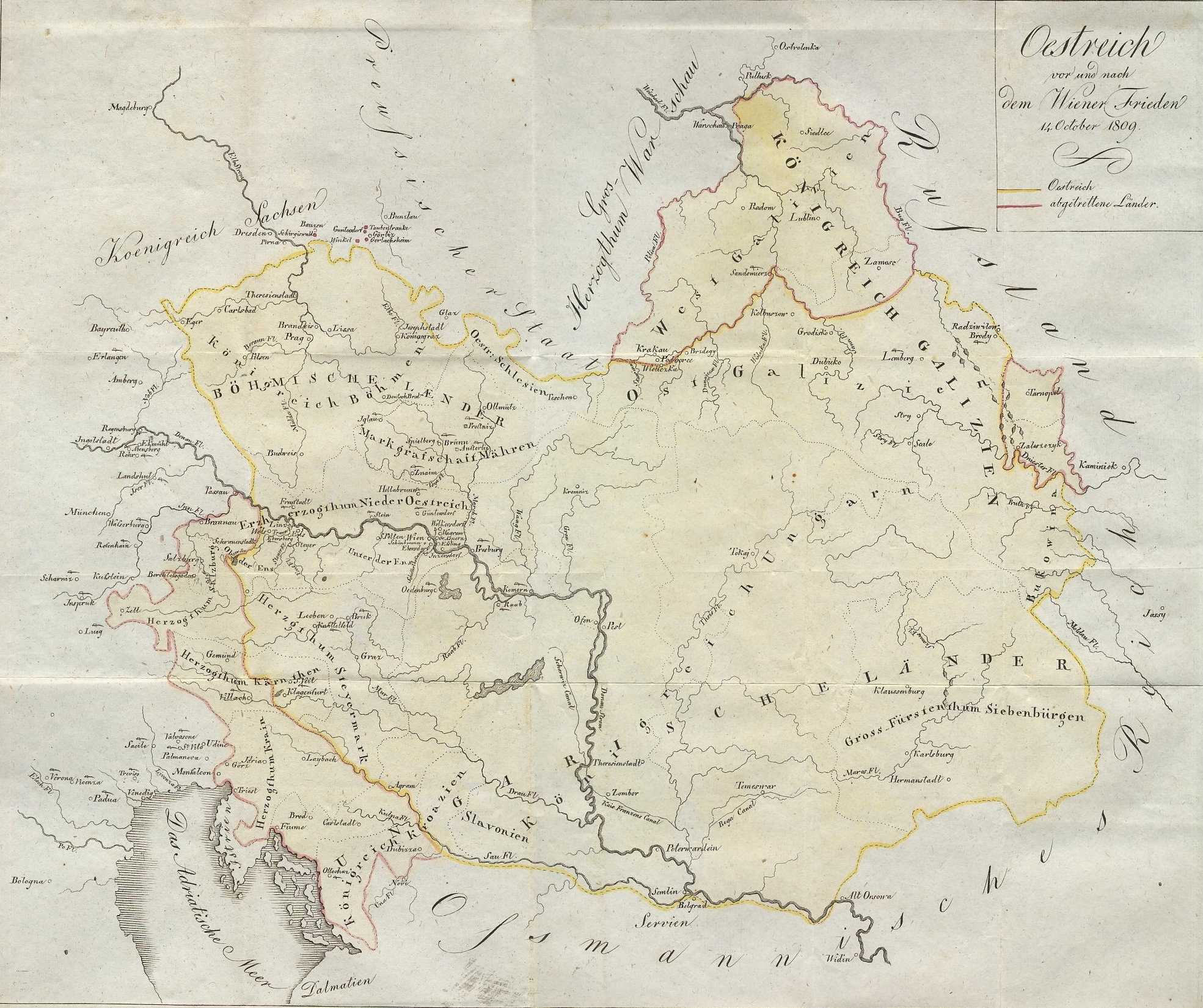
Map of the Austrian Empire showing the territorial losses after the Peace of Schönbrunn within red borders.

France imposed harsh peace terms: Austria had to cede the Duchy of Salzburg to Bavaria and lost its access to the Adriatic Sea by waiving the Littoral territories of Gorizia and Gradisca and the Imperial Free City of Trieste, together with Carniola, the March of Istria, western ("Upper") Carinthia with East Tyrol, and the Croatian lands southwest of the river Sava to the French Empire (see Illyrian Provinces). West Galicia was ceded to the Duchy of Warsaw, and Tarnopol district to the Russian Empire.

Austria recognized Napoleon's previous conquests from other nations as well as the rule of his brother Joseph Bonaparte as King of Spain. Austria also paid to France a large indemnity and the Austrian army was reduced to 150,000 men - a promise not fulfilled. The Graz Schlossberg fortress, whose garrison had firmly resisted the French occupation forces, was largely demolished.

Austria also had to apply Napoleon's Continental System, as Britain remained at war with France. One contemporary British view on the treaty was:

This Treaty is certainly one of the most singular documents in the annals of diplomacy. We see a Christian King, calling himself the father of his people, disposing of 400,000 of his subjects, like swine in a market. We see a great and powerful Prince condescending to treat with his adversary for the brushwood of his own forests. We see the hereditary claimant of the Imperial Sceptre of Germany not only condescending to the past innovations on his own dominions, but assenting to any future alterations which the caprice or tyranny of his enemy may dictate with respect to his allies in Spain and Portugal, or to his neighbours in Italy.—We see through the whole of this instrument the humiliation of the weak and unfortunate Francis, who has preferred the resignation of his fairest territories to restoring to his vassals their liberties, and giving them that interest in the public cause which their valour would have known how to protect.—O, the brave and loyal, but, we fear, lost Tyrolese!

— The Gentleman's Magazine (1809).

Though considerably weakened, Austria remained a European great power. Emperor Francis I approached to the French by marrying his daughter Marie Louise off to Napoleon (whom she at first detested) in 1810. As a result of Metternich's change of policies, the Austrian forces joined the French invasion of Russia in 1812.

== Assassination attempt ==
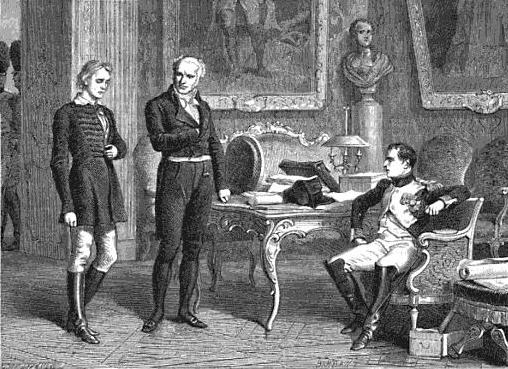
Staps is interrogated by Napoleon and his physician Jean-Nicolas Corvisart, 1866 depiction. In reality, Rapp was present to translate between the Emperor and Staps

During the negotiations at Schönbrunn, Napoleon narrowly escaped an attempt on his life. On 12 October, shortly before signing the treaty, the emperor exited the palace with a large entourage to observe a military parade. Seventeen year old Friedrich Staps, son of a Lutheran pastor from Naumburg, had arrived in Vienna and demanded an audience to present a petition. He was refused by the emperor's aide General Jean Rapp, who shortly thereafter observed Staps in the courtyard pushing through the crowd towards Napoleon from a different direction, and had him arrested.

Taken to the palace, Staps was found to be carrying a large kitchen knife inside his coat, concealed in the petition papers. Interrogated, Staps frankly revealed his plans to kill the emperor, calling him the misfortune of his country. Brought forward to Napoleon, he asked whether Staps would thank him if he was pardoned, to which Staps replied: "I would kill you none the less."

Napoleon left Vienna on 16 October and the next day Staps was shot by Württemberg fusiliers outside the palace. At this execution, he is said to have shouted "Long live freedom! Long live Germany!" Napoleon, impressed and fearing a greater conspiracy, instructed his police minister Joseph Fouché to keep the incident secret.

Soon after the German campaign of 1813, Staps came to be seen as a martyr of the burgeoning German nationalism. He was the subject of a poem by Christian Friedrich Hebbel and a play by Walter von Molo.
