= Théâtre municipal de Colmar =

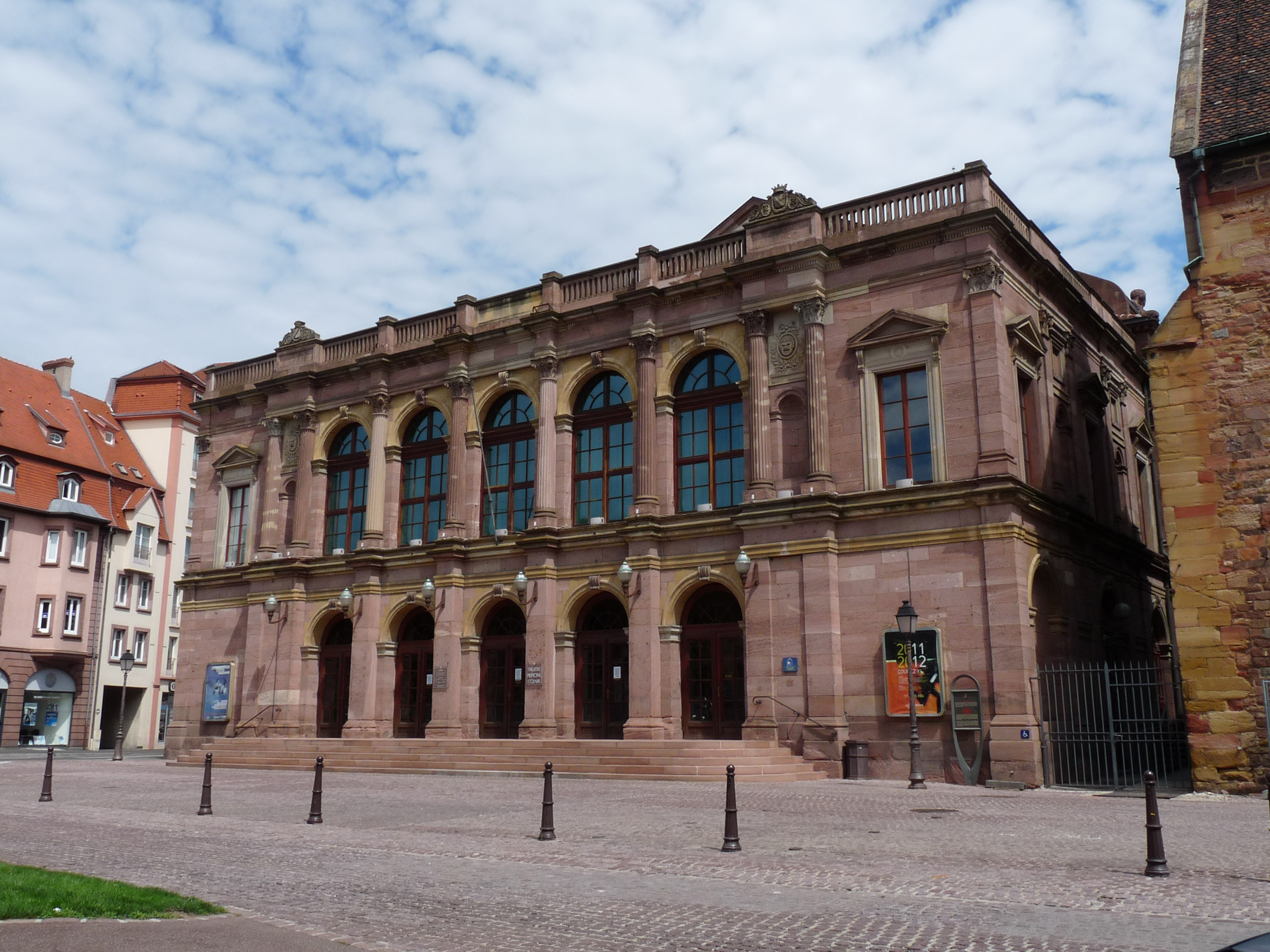
- Interactive map of Théâtre municipal de Colmar
- Address: Rue Kleber; 68000 Colmar; France
- Coordinates: 48.079674°N 7.354778°E
- Type: Theater

Construction
- Opened: 1849
- Architect: Louis-Michel Boltz

Website
- Officiel site

The Théâtre municipal de Colmar is a theater located in Colmar, in the French department of Haut-Rhin. The circular room is designed in the tradition of Italian theaters and includes three galleries. It is located in the Rue Kleber, next to the Unterlinden Museum. The building was constructed between 1847 and 1849, to replace an old part of the Unterlinden convent. It was opened on 8 March 1849 and underwent a restoration in 2000. It displays a French stylish exterior with five bays. The interior design is the work of Boulangé. The yearly attendance is about 30,000.
