= Hôtel de Ville, Colmar =

Town hall in Colmar, France

Hôtel de Ville
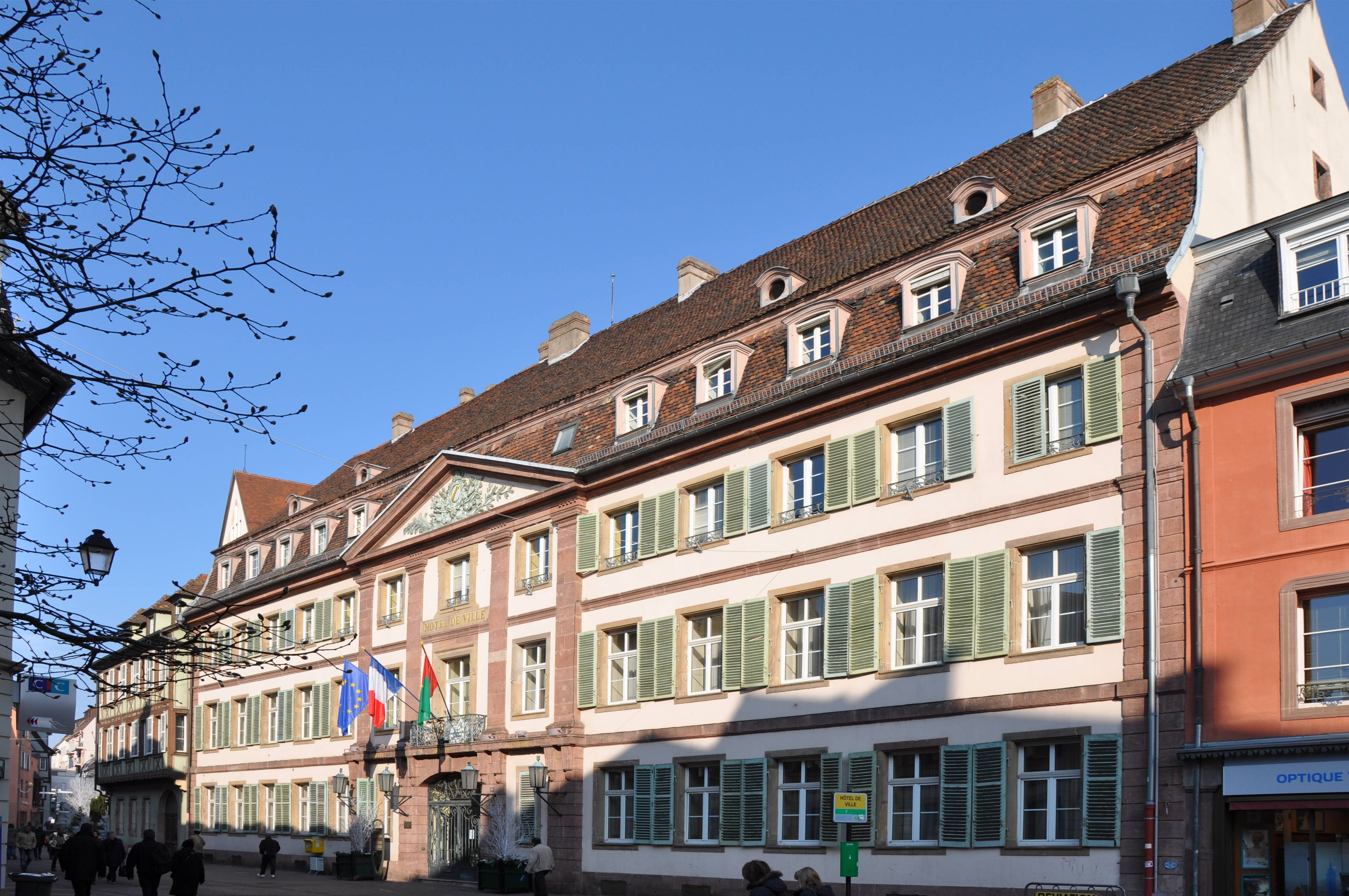
- The main frontage of the Hôtel de Ville in February 2011

General information
- Type: City hall
- Architectural style: Neoclassical style
- Location: Colmar, France
- Coordinates: 48.0791°N 7.3585°E
- Completed: 1782

Design and construction
- Architect: Gabriel Ignace Ritter

Monument historique
- Official name: Hôtel de ville
- Type: Inscrit
- Designated: 1929
- Reference no.: PA00085373

The Hôtel de Ville (French pronunciation: [otɛl də vil], City Hall) is a municipal building in Colmar, Haut-Rhin, eastern France, standing on Rue des Clefs. It was designated a monument historique by the French government in 1929.

== History ==
The site was previously occupied by an old courthouse which belonged to the Pairis Abbey and dated back to the late 16th century. The monks acquired the property from the bailiff of Ensisheim, Jean-Jacques Reiss, in 1775, so that they could have it demolished and replaced by a new residence for their own use. Construction of the new building started in 1779. It was designed by Gabriel Ignace Ritter from Guebwiller in the neoclassical style, built in brick with a cement render and stone dressings, and was completed in 1782.

The design involved a symmetrical main frontage of 13 bays facing onto Rue des Clefs. The central section of three bays featured a segmental headed opening with a rusticated surround and a keystone, flanked by two casement windows with stone surrounds. On the first floor, there was a French door with a stone surround and an iron railing, flanked by two more casement windows with stone surrounds and, on the second floor, there were three casement windows also with stone surrounds. The bays in the central section were flanked by Doric order pilasters supporting an entablature and a pediment with carvings in the tympanum. The wings were fenestrated with casement windows in a similar style but with shutters. There were dormer windows at roof level.

Following the suppression of the monasteries during the French Revolution, the building was seized by the state and, in 1800, it became the préfecture of Haut-Rhin, where it hosted visits by Charles X in 1828, by Louis Philippe I in 1831 and by Napoleon III in 1850. Eventually the building was considered too small and the préfecture relocated to Rue Bruat in 1866.

The local town council, which had been accommodated in a dilapidated building dating from 1525, acquired the former préfecture and converted it for municipal use as the local town hall.

Following the liberation of the town by the French First Army, commanded by General Jean de Lattre de Tassigny, on 2 February 1945, during the Second World War, the prefect, Jacques Fonlupt-Espéraber, and the mayor, Jacques Edouard Richard, addressed the crowd from the balcony of the town hall. A modern extension to the town hall, overlooking Place de la Marie, was completed in 1981.
