= Ancienne Douane, Colmar =

Ancienne Douane
- Alsatian: Koïfhus
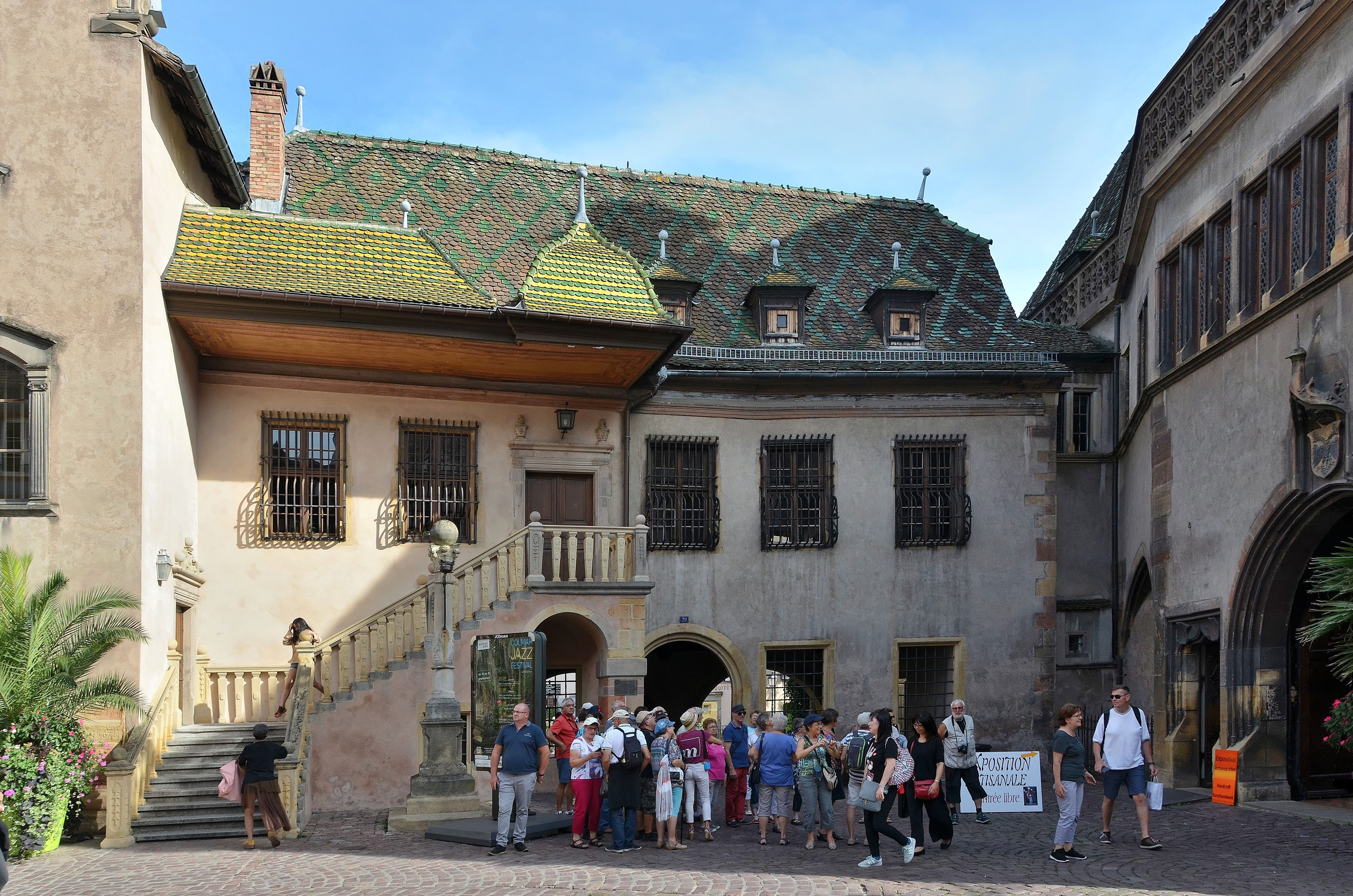
- West side of Ancienne Douane in 2018
- Interactive map of the Ancienne Douane area

General information
- Type: customs house
- Architectural style: Gothic; Renaissance
- Location: Colmar, France, 29, Grand′Rue; Place de l′Ancienne Douane
- Coordinates: 48°04′33″N 7°21′32″E
- Completed: 1480 late 16th/early 17th century
- Renovated: 1895–1898; 2002
- Owner: Municipality of Colmar

Ancienne Douane ("Old Custom house"), also known as Koïfhus, is a Gothic and Renaissance building in Colmar, France. It is classified as a monument historique by the French Ministry of Culture since 1930. It is also the birthplace of general Jean Rapp.

The building currently houses a restaurant as well as temporary exhibitions and fairs.

== Gallery ==
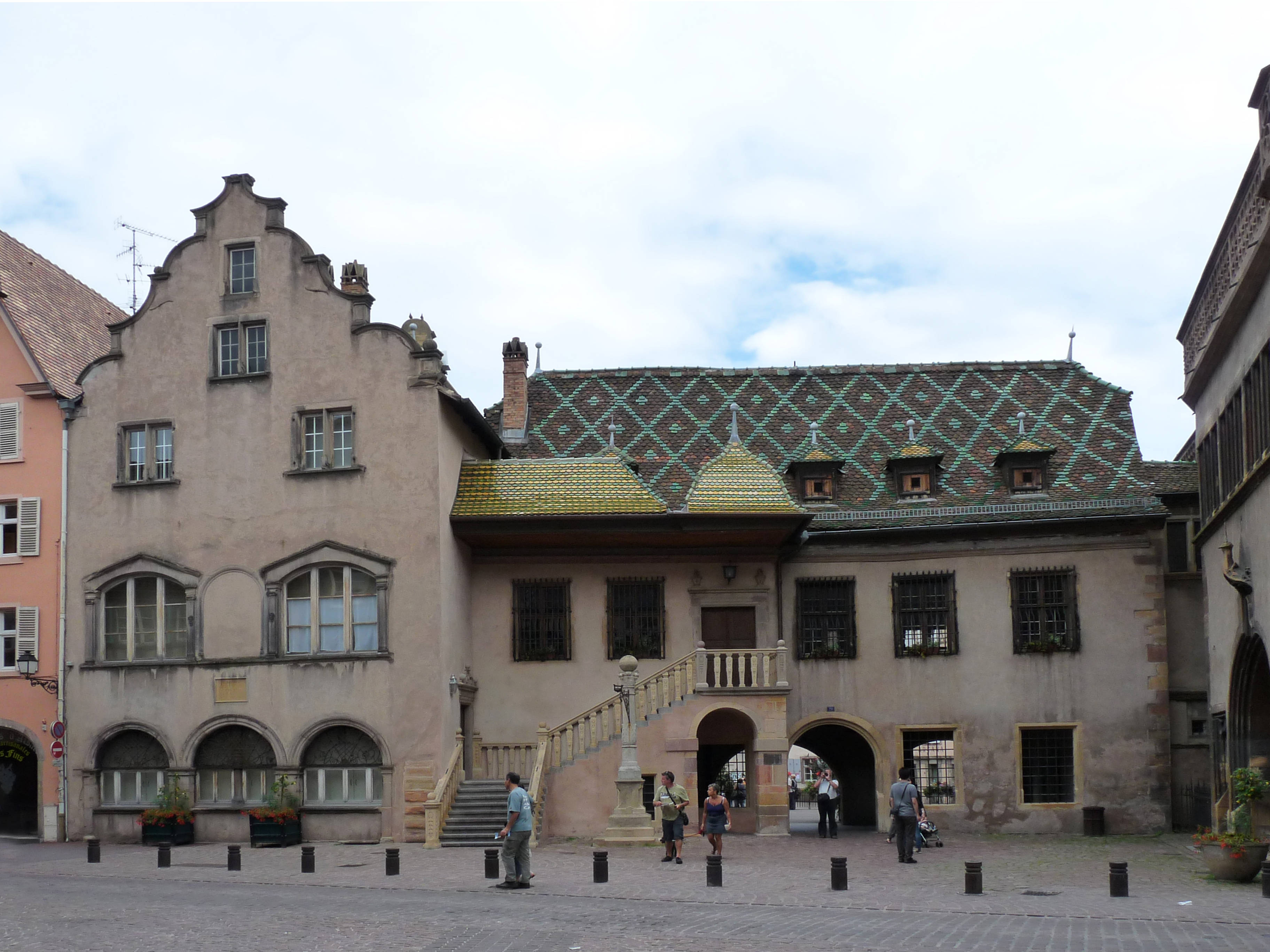
West side

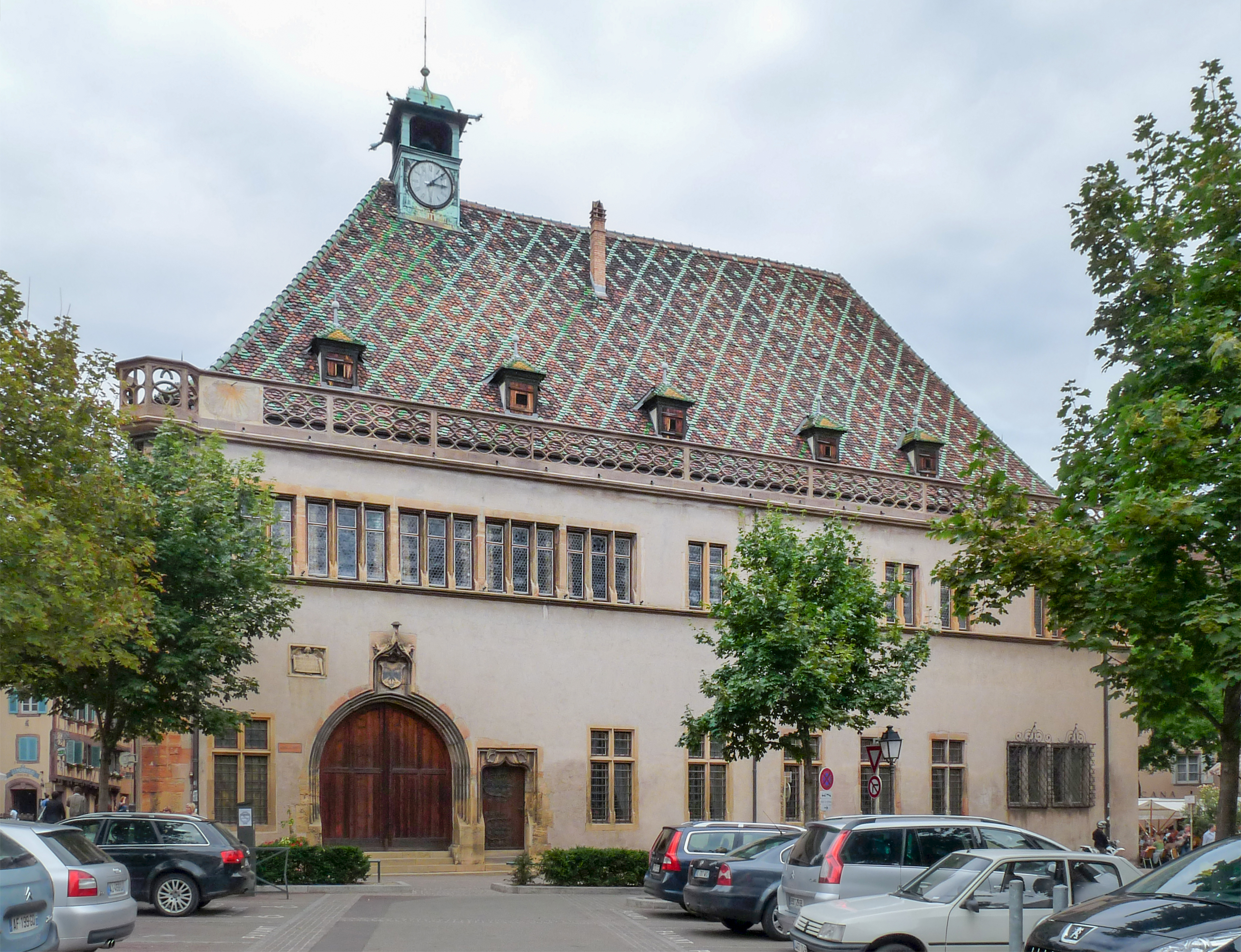
South side

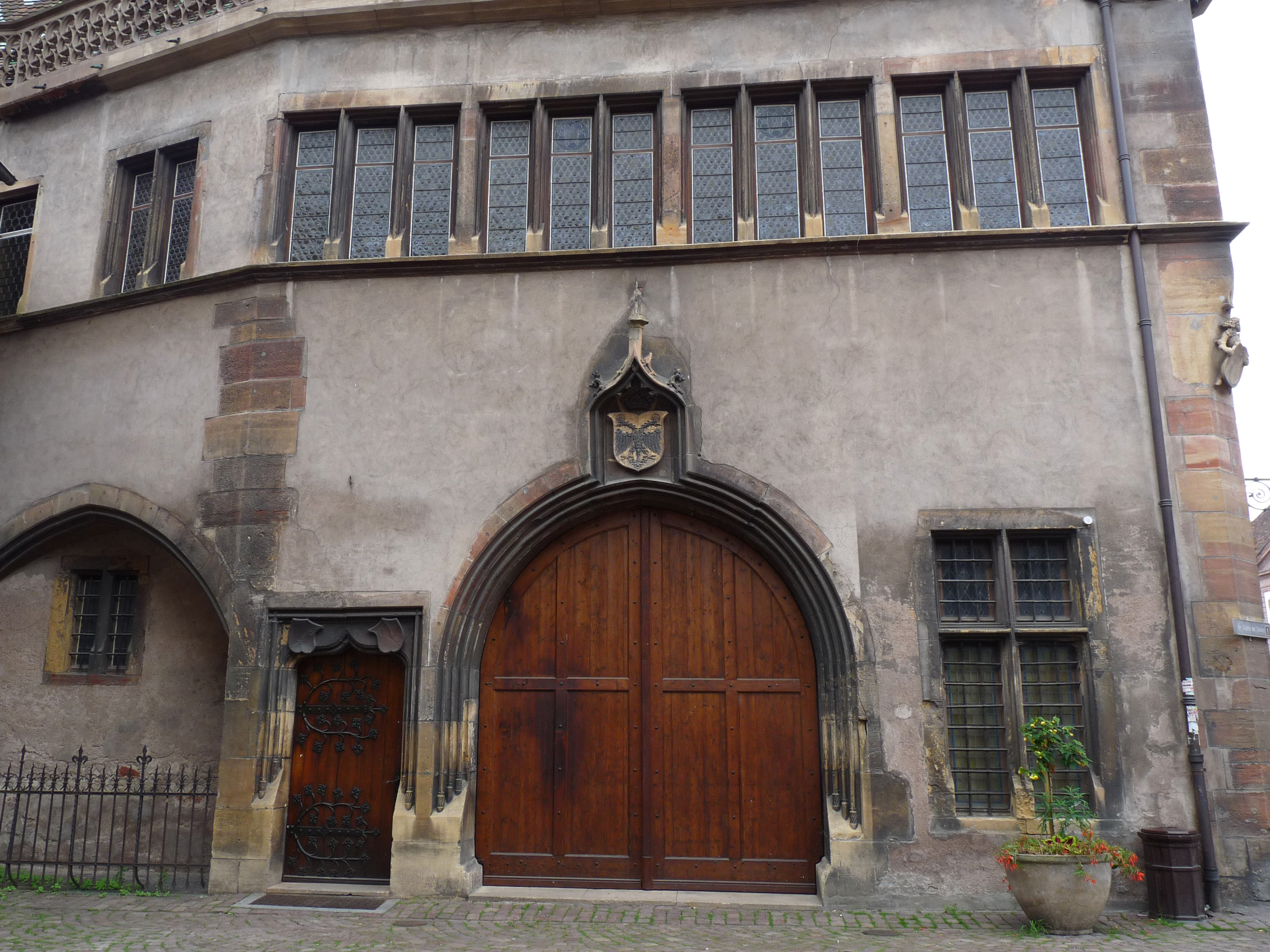
1480 portals

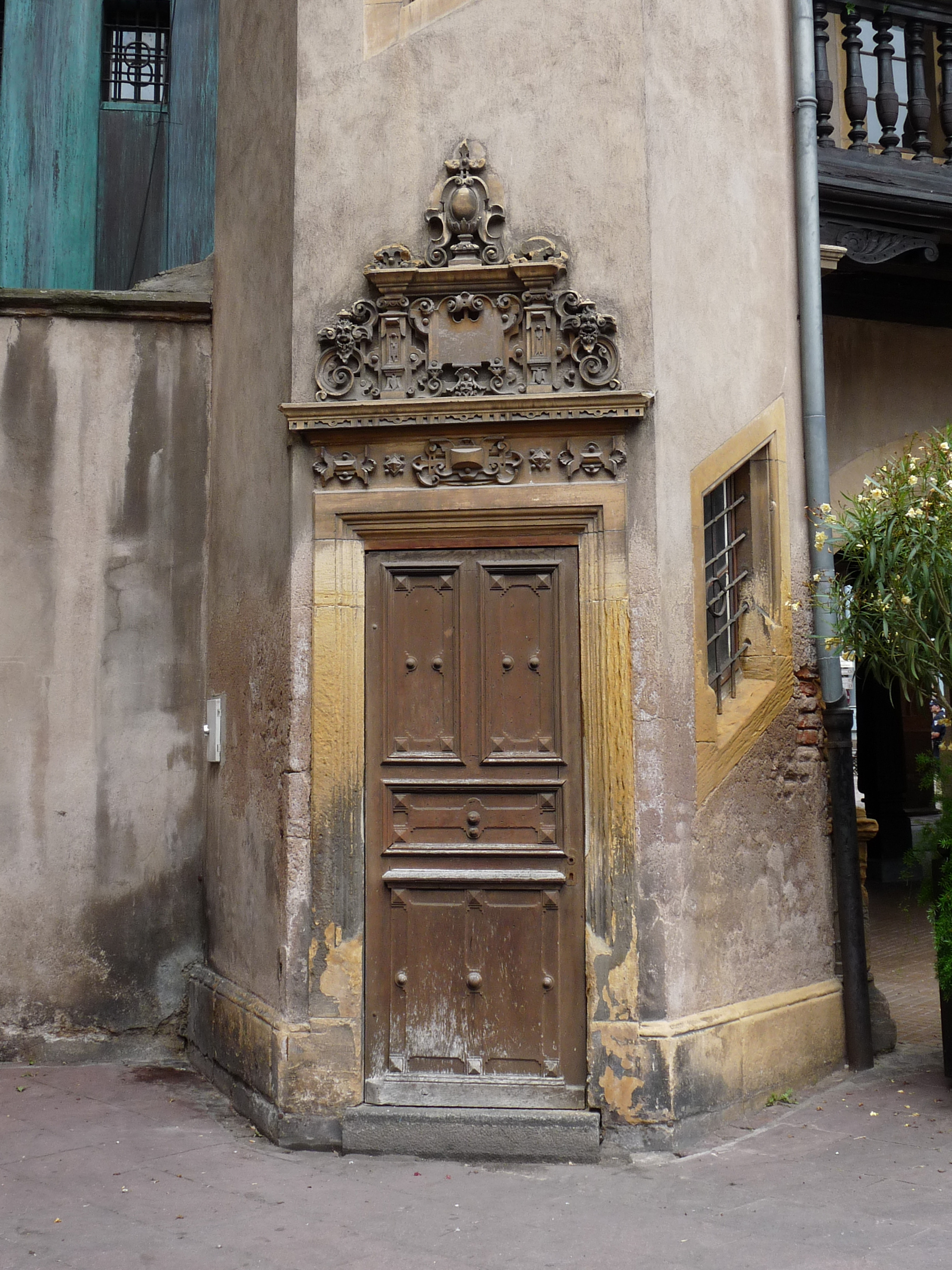
Renaissance portal

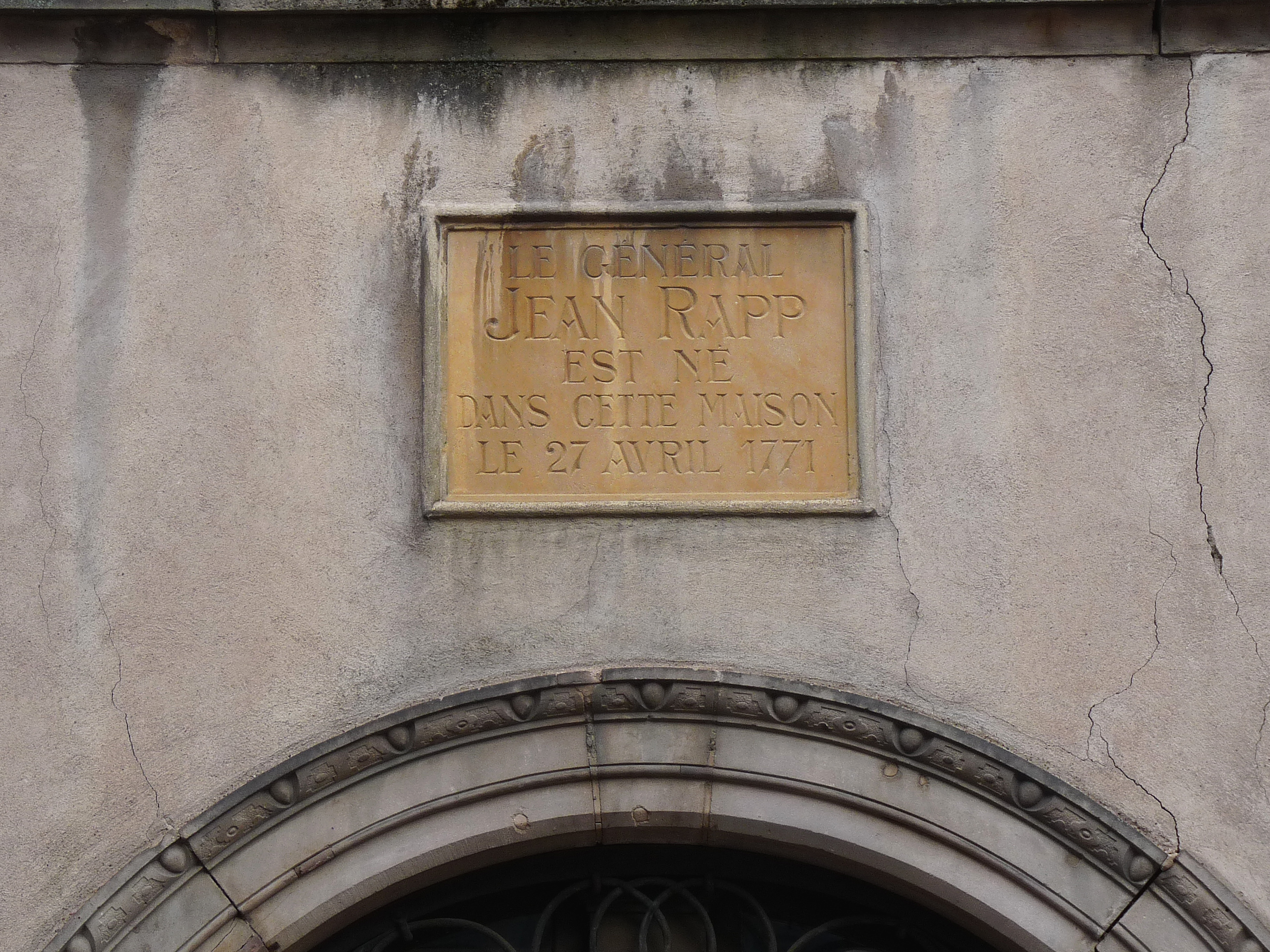
Plaque for Jean Rapp
