= Canton of Colmar-1 =

Coordinates: 48.09°N 7.36°E

The canton of Colmar-1 is an administrative division of the Haut-Rhin department, northeastern France. It was created at the French canton re-organisation which came into effect in March 2015. Its seat is in Colmar.

It consists of the following communes:

1. Colmar (partly)
2. Ingersheim
