= Colmar =

City in Alsace, France

Colmar Colmer (Alsatian)
- Prefecture and commune
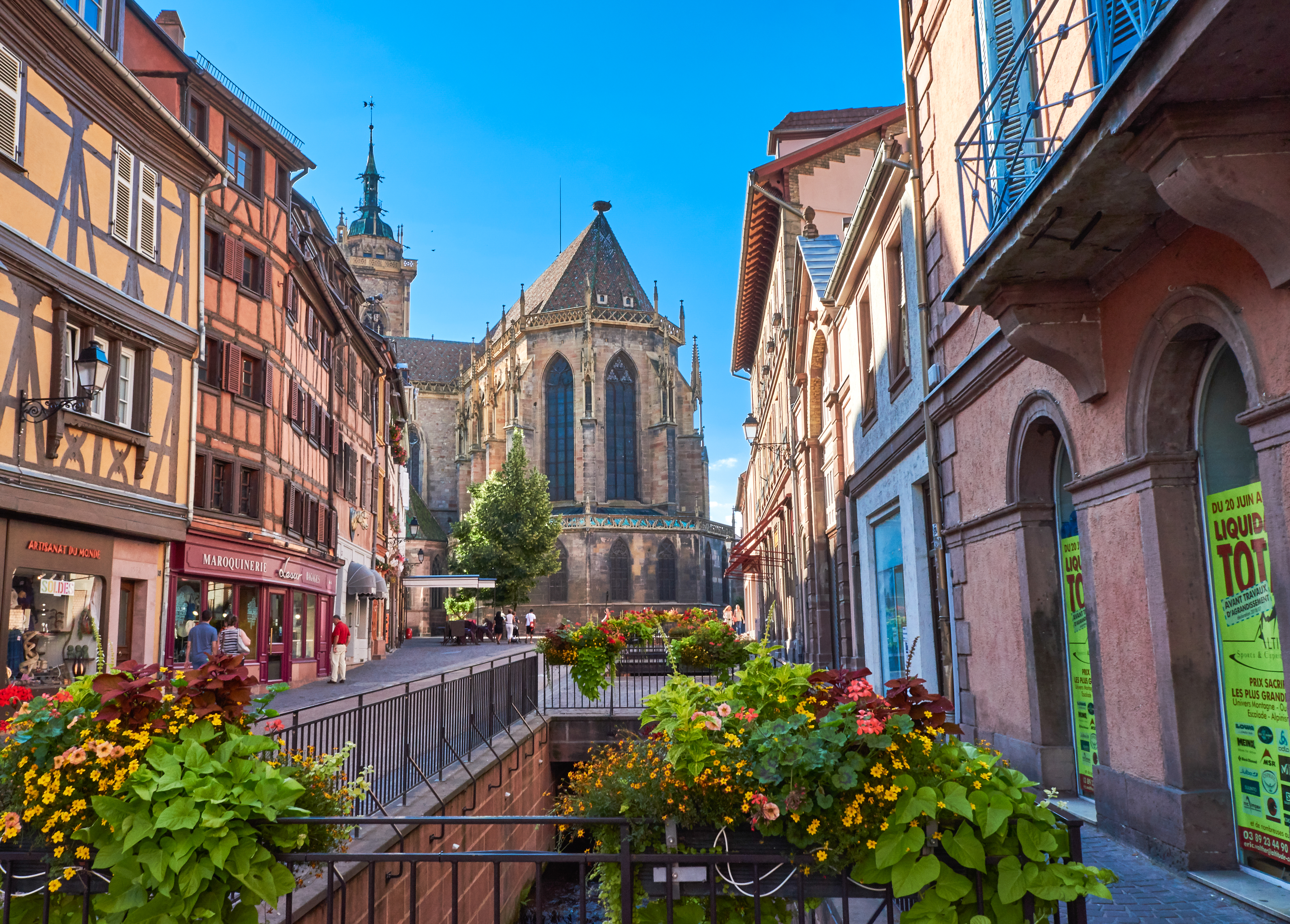
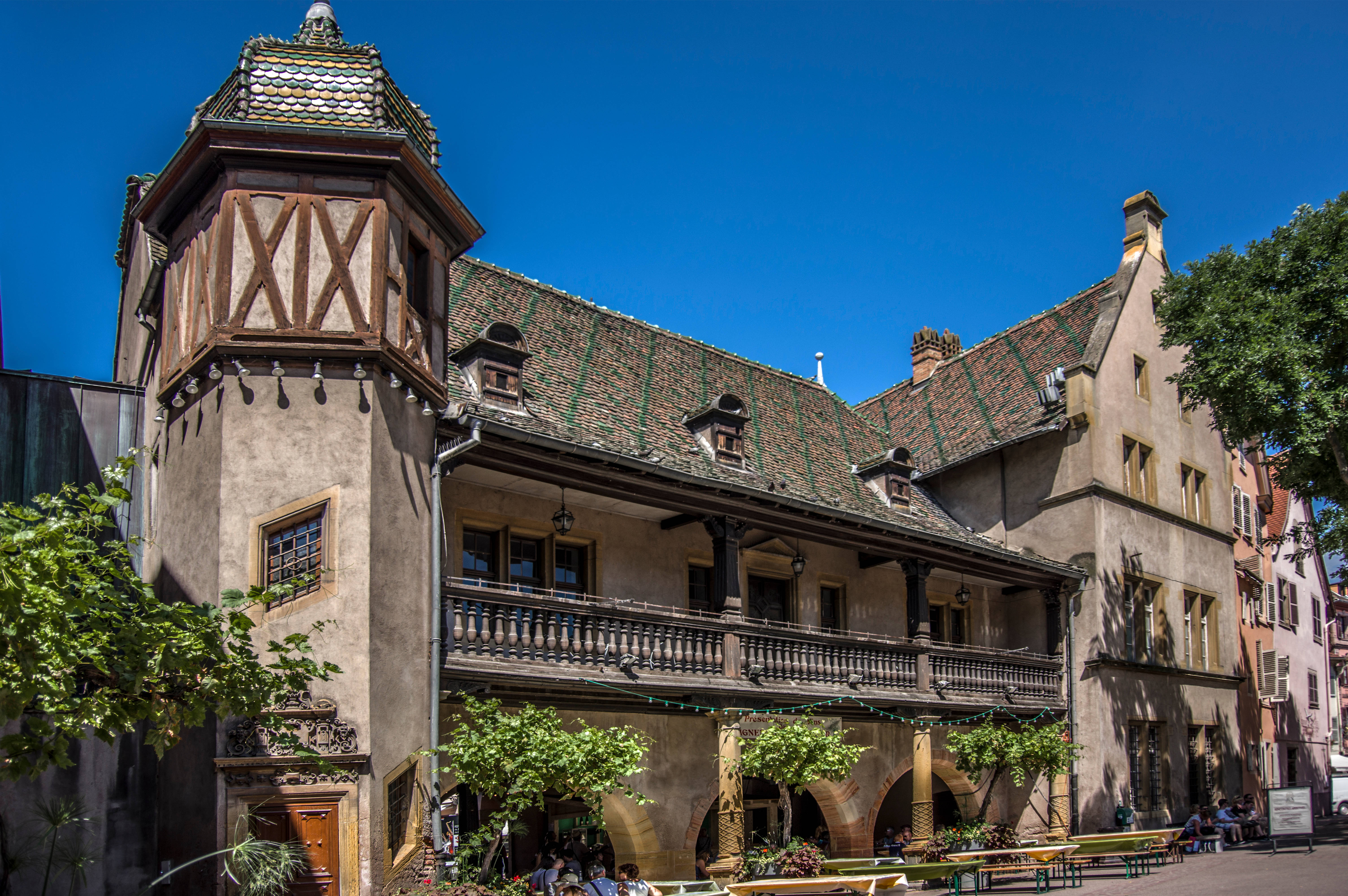
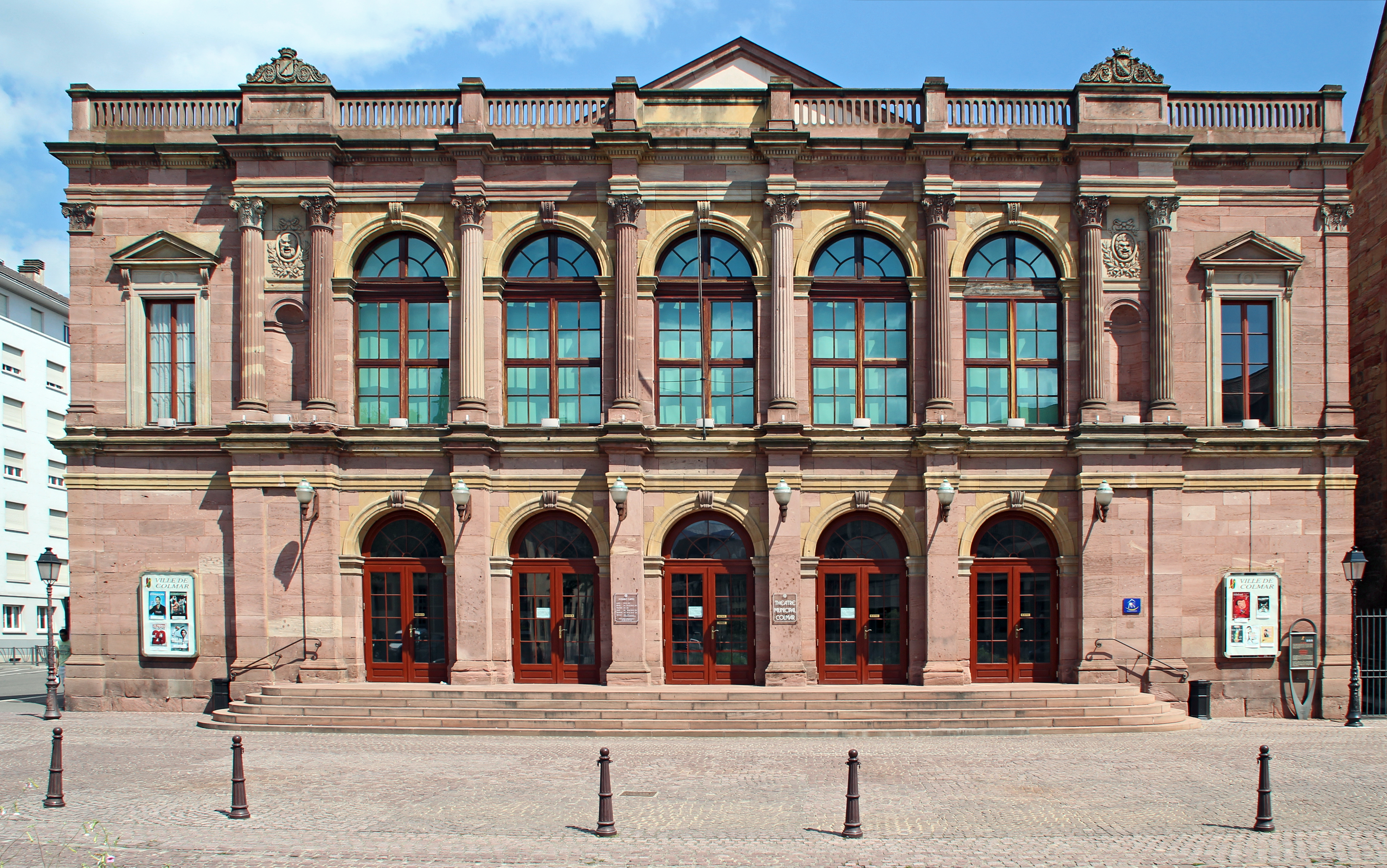
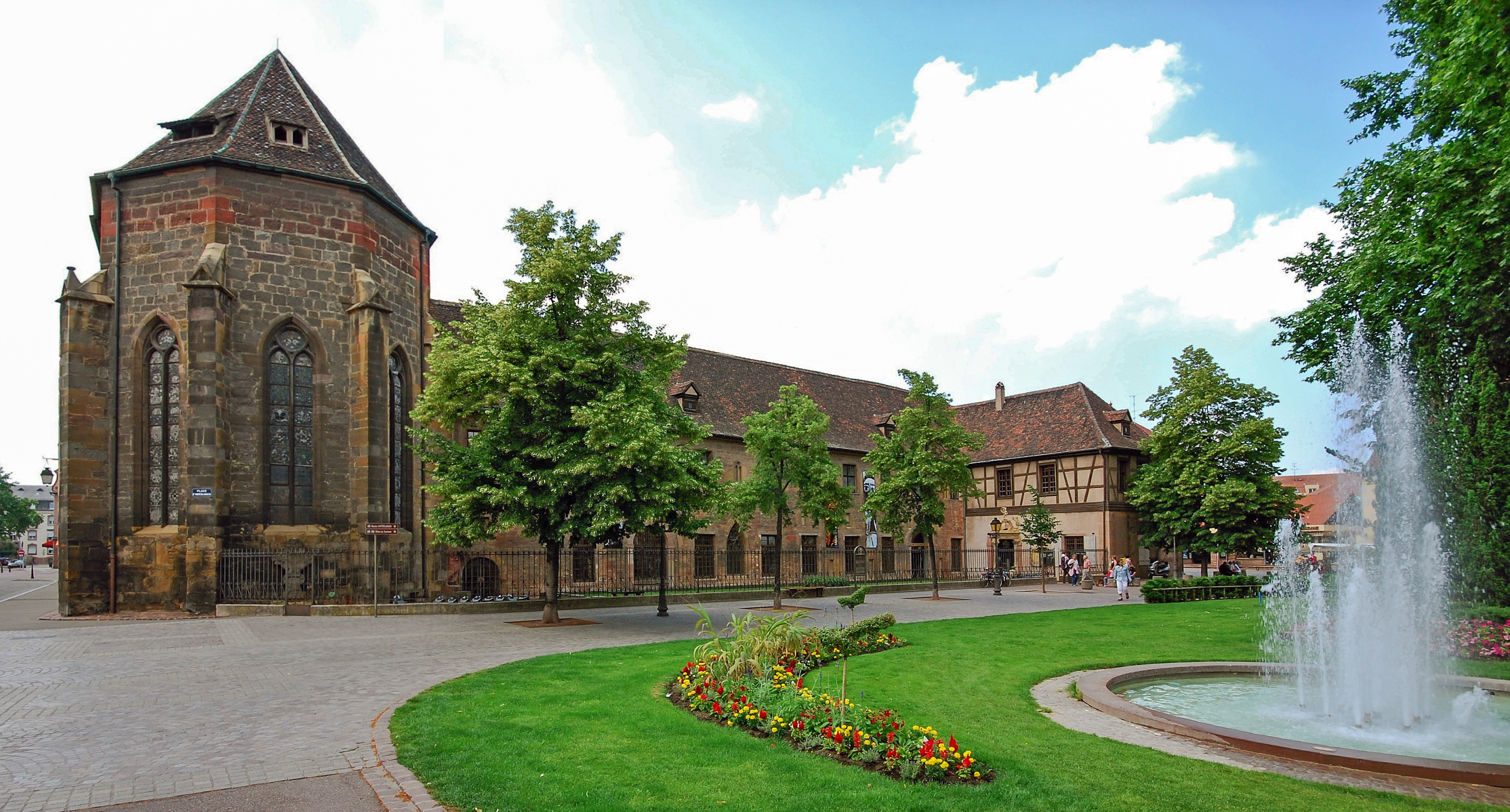
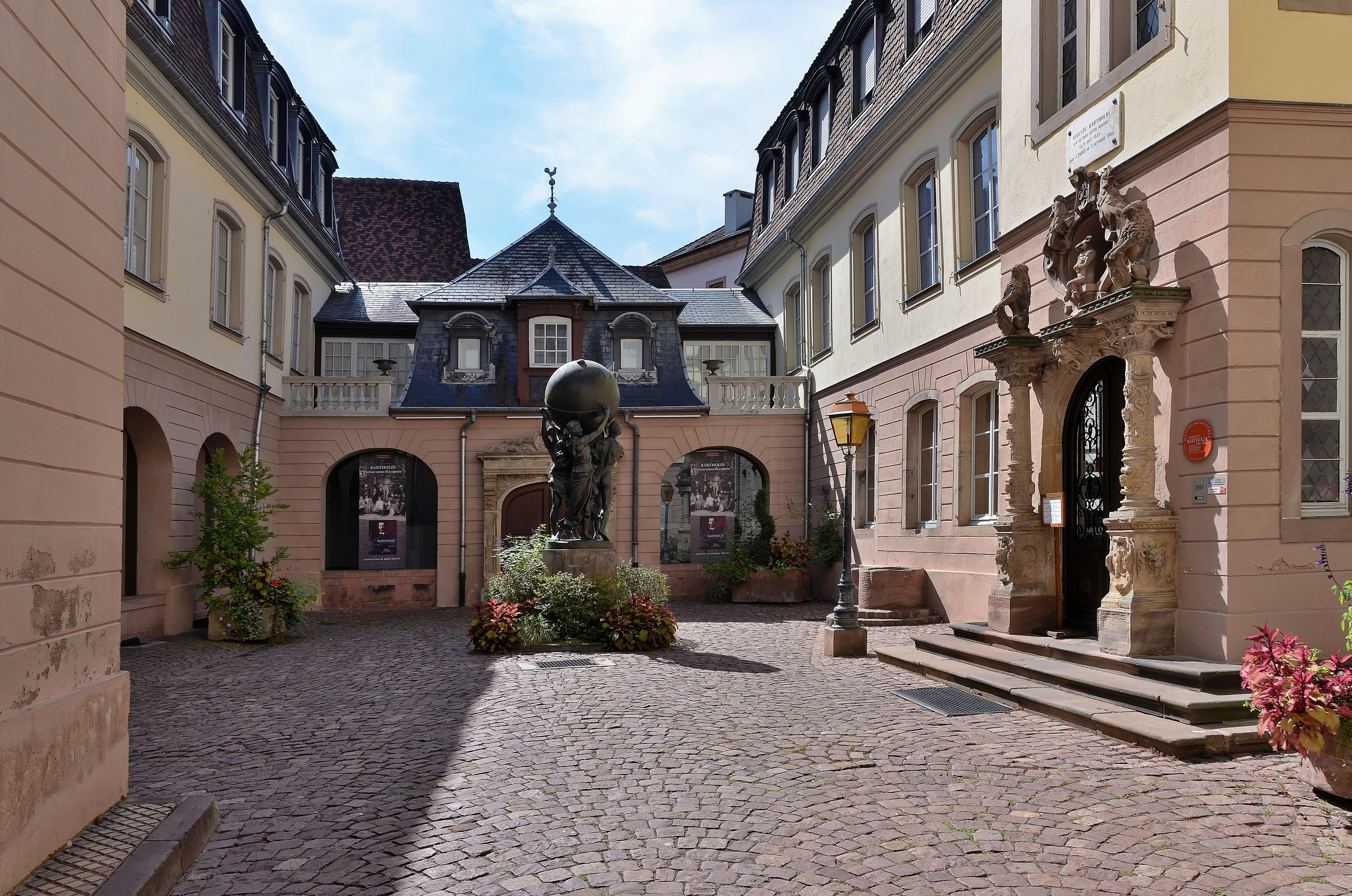
- Little Venice and St Martin's Church Ancienne Douane Théâtre municipal Unterlinden Museum Musée Bartholdi

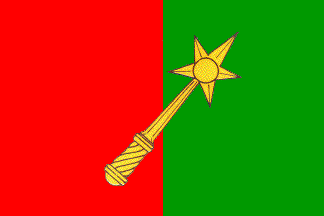
- Flag Coat of arms
- Location of Colmar
- Location within France Location within Grand Est
- Coordinates: 48°04′54″N 7°21′20″E
- Country: France
- Region: Grand Est
- Department: Haut-Rhin
- Arrondissement: Colmar-Ribeauvillé
- Canton: Colmar-1 and 2
- Intercommunality: Colmar Agglomération

Government
  - Mayor (2026–32): Éric Straumann (DVD)
- Area^{1}: 66.57 km^{2} (25.70 sq mi)
- Elevation: 197 m (646 ft)
- Highest elevation: 214 m (702 ft)
- Lowest elevation: 175 m (574 ft)
- Population (2023): 66,970
  - Density: 1,006/km^{2} (2,606/sq mi)
- Time zone: UTC+01:00 (CET)
  - Summer (DST): UTC+02:00 (CEST)
- INSEE/Postal code: 68066 /68000
- Dialling codes: 0389
- ^{1} French Land Register data, which excludes lakes, ponds, glaciers > 1 km^{2} (0.386 sq mi or 247 acres) and river estuaries.

Colmar (French pronunciation: [kɔlmaʁ]; Alsatian: Colmer [ˈkolməʁ]) is a city and commune in the Haut-Rhin department and Alsace region of north-eastern France. The third-largest commune in Alsace (after Strasbourg and Mulhouse), it is the seat of the prefecture of the Haut-Rhin department and of the subprefecture of the Colmar-Ribeauvillé arrondissement.

Colmar was first mentioned in the 9th century and grew into an important medieval trading town within the Holy Roman Empire. In the 17th century it was annexed by France under Louis XIV, though it retained a distinct German character due to its location, predominant language, and culture. The city shifted between French and German control multiple times, before becoming part of France again in 1944.

The city is known for its well-preserved old town, numerous architectural landmarks, its blend of French and German heritage and its museums, among which is the Unterlinden Museum, which houses the Isenheim Altarpiece.

Colmar is located on the Alsatian Wine Route and considers itself to be the capital of Alsatian wine (capitale des vins d'Alsace).

== History ==
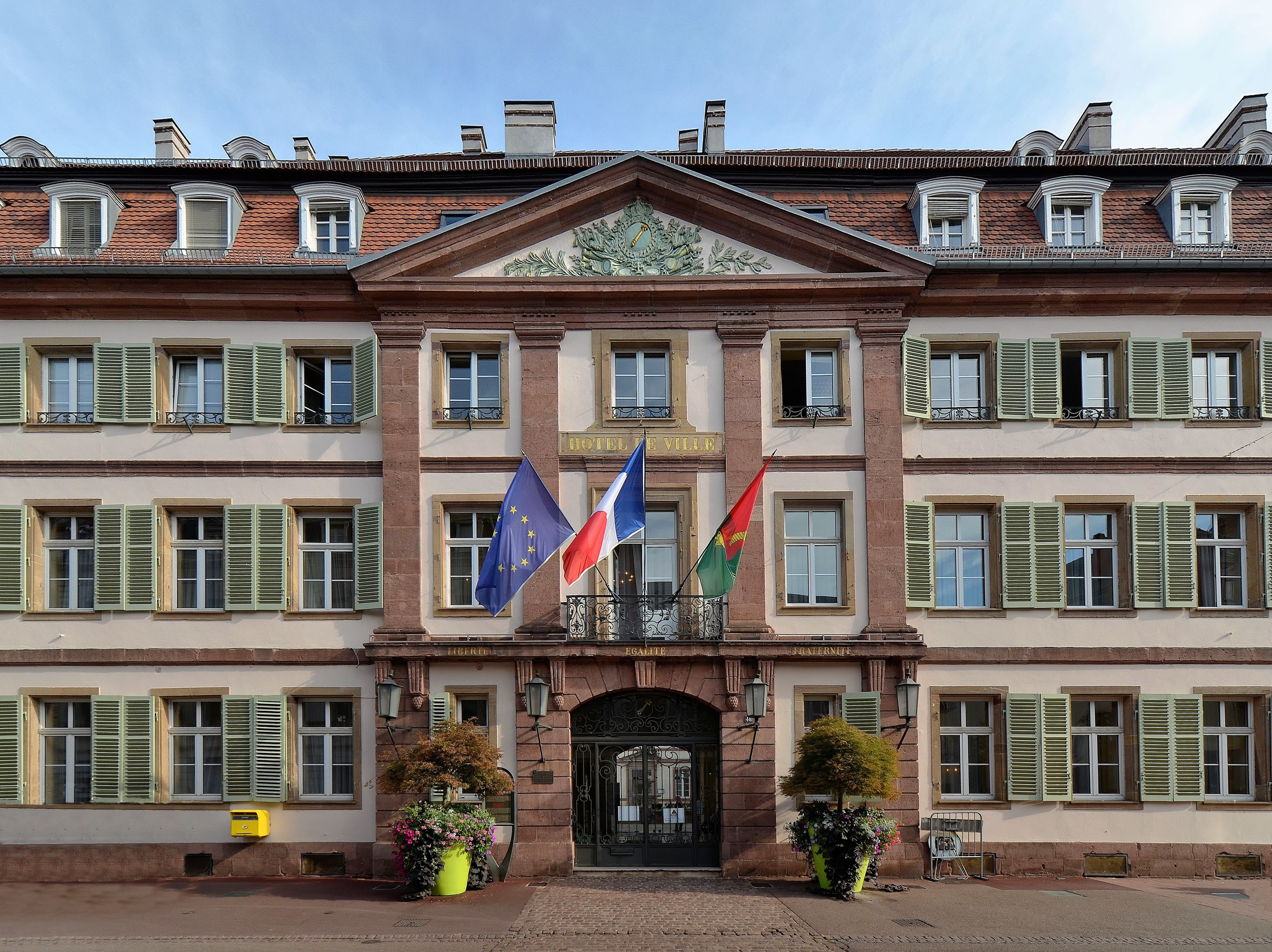
The Hôtel de Ville

Colmar was first mentioned by Charlemagne in his chronicle about Saxon wars. This was the location where the Carolingian Emperor Charles the Fat held a diet in 884. Colmar was granted the status of a free imperial city by Emperor Frederick II in 1226. In 1354 it joined the Décapole city league. The city adopted the Protestant Reformation in 1575, long after the northern neighbours of Strasbourg and Sélestat. During the Thirty Years' War, it was taken by the Swedish army in 1632, which held it for two years. In 1634, the Schoeman family arrived and started the first town library. In 1635, the city's harvest was spoiled by Imperialist forces while the residents shot at them from the walls.

The city was conquered by France under King Louis XIV in 1673 and officially ceded by the 1679 Treaties of Nijmegen. In 1854 a cholera epidemic killed many in the city. With the rest of Alsace, Colmar was ceded to the newly formed German Empire in 1871 as a result of the Franco-Prussian War and incorporated into the Alsace–Lorraine province. It returned to France after World War I according to the 1919 Treaty of Versailles, was annexed by Nazi Germany in 1940, and then reverted to French control after the battle of the "Colmar Pocket" in 1945. Colmar has been continuously governed by conservative parties since 1947, the Popular Republican Movement (1947–1977), the Union for French Democracy (1977–1995) and the Union for a Popular Movement (since 1995), and has had only three mayors during that time.

The Colmar Treasure, a hoard of precious objects hidden by Jews during the Black Death, was discovered here in 1863.

== Geography ==
Colmar is 64 kilometres (40 mi) south-southwest of Strasbourg, at 48.08°N, 7.36°E, on the River Lauch, a tributary of the Ill. It is located immediately to the east of the Vosges and connected to the Rhine in the east by a canal.

In 2022 the commune of Colmar had a population of 67,360, and the metropolitan area of Colmar had a population of 199,627. Colmar is the centre of the arrondissement of Colmar-Ribeauvillé.

== Climate ==
Colmar has an oceanic climate (Köppen: Cfb) but it is significantly modified by the city's location far inland, with cold, dry winters and warm to hot, wetter summers.

The city has a sunny microclimate and is one of the driest cities in France, with an annual precipitation of just 595 mm (23.4 in), making it ideal for Alsace wine. It is considered the capital of the Alsatian wine region.

The town's dryness is due to its location near the mountains, which force clouds arriving from the west to rise. Most of their moisture condenses and falls over the higher ground, leaving the air warm and dry by the time it reaches Colmar.

The city therefore has more of a continental climate and winter and summer temperatures can sometimes be the lowest or highest in France.

Comparison of local Meteorological data with other cities in France
Town	Sunshine (hours/yr)	Rain (mm/yr)	Snow (days/yr)	Storm (days/yr)	Fog (days/yr)
National average	1,973	770	14	22	40
Colmar	1,780.7	606.6	25.7	24.8	55.4
Paris	1,661	637	12	18	10
Nice	2,724	767	1	29	1
Strasbourg	1,693	665	29	29	56
Brest	1,605	1,211	7	12	75

Climate data for Colmar (1991–2020 normals, extremes 1957–present)
Month	Jan	Feb	Mar	Apr	May	Jun	Jul	Aug	Sep	Oct	Nov	Dec	Year
Record high °C (°F)	18.6 (65.5)	22.7 (72.9)	27.3 (81.1)	29.7 (85.5)	34.7 (94.5)	41.0 (105.8)	39.4 (102.9)	40.9 (105.6)	33.8 (92.8)	30.7 (87.3)	24.0 (75.2)	20.3 (68.5)	41.0 (105.8)
Mean daily maximum °C (°F)	5.6 (42.1)	7.6 (45.7)	12.6 (54.7)	17.1 (62.8)	21.0 (69.8)	24.7 (76.5)	26.7 (80.1)	26.5 (79.7)	22.0 (71.6)	16.3 (61.3)	9.8 (49.6)	6.3 (43.3)	16.4 (61.5)
Daily mean °C (°F)	2.4 (36.3)	3.5 (38.3)	7.2 (45.0)	11.1 (52.0)	15.2 (59.4)	18.8 (65.8)	20.6 (69.1)	20.3 (68.5)	16.1 (61.0)	11.5 (52.7)	6.2 (43.2)	3.2 (37.8)	11.3 (52.3)
Mean daily minimum °C (°F)	−0.8 (30.6)	−0.7 (30.7)	1.9 (35.4)	5.1 (41.2)	9.4 (48.9)	12.9 (55.2)	14.4 (57.9)	14.0 (57.2)	10.2 (50.4)	6.7 (44.1)	2.7 (36.9)	0.2 (32.4)	6.3 (43.3)
Record low °C (°F)	−22.0 (−7.6)	−24.8 (−12.6)	−16.0 (3.2)	−7.3 (18.9)	−3.1 (26.4)	2.1 (35.8)	4.0 (39.2)	3.2 (37.8)	−1.0 (30.2)	−7.6 (18.3)	−13.1 (8.4)	−19.0 (−2.2)	−24.8 (−12.6)
Average precipitation mm (inches)	33.1 (1.30)	30.6 (1.20)	34.0 (1.34)	42.8 (1.69)	69.8 (2.75)	66.2 (2.61)	62.8 (2.47)	60.8 (2.39)	51.3 (2.02)	56.8 (2.24)	43.6 (1.72)	43.2 (1.70)	595.0 (23.43)
Average precipitation days (≥ 1.0 mm)	7.1	7.0	7.5	8.5	10.6	9.4	9.2	9.4	7.6	9.3	7.9	8.1	101.6
Average snowy days	7.0	6.2	3.6	1.1	0.0	0.0	0.0	0.0	0.0	0.0	2.7	5.1	25.7
Average relative humidity (%)	87	82	76	74	75	72	69	72	76	83	87	88	78.4
Source 1: Meteociel
Source 2: Infoclimat.fr (humidity and snowy days, 1961–1990)

== Population ==
Historical population

Year	Pop.	±% p.a.
1793	13,000	—
1800	11,933	−1.22%
1806	14,465	+3.26%
1821	14,300	−0.08%
1831	15,442	+0.77%
1836	15,958	+0.66%
1841	19,908	+4.52%
1846	20,050	+0.14%
1851	21,348	+1.26%
1856	21,284	−0.06%
1861	22,629	+1.23%
1866	23,669	+0.90%
1871	23,311	−0.30%
1875	23,990	+0.72%
1880	26,106	+1.70%
1885	26,537	+0.33%
1890	30,399	+2.75%
1895	33,146	+1.75%
1900	36,844	+2.14%

Year	Pop.	±% p.a.
1905	41,791	+2.55%
1910	43,808	+0.95%
1921	42,255	−0.33%
1926	43,167	+0.43%
1931	46,518	+1.51%
1936	49,448	+1.23%
1946	46,124	−0.69%
1954	47,305	+0.32%
1962	52,355	+1.28%
1968	59,550	+2.17%
1975	64,771	+1.21%
1982	62,483	−0.51%
1990	63,498	+0.20%
1999	65,136	+0.28%
2007	66,560	+0.27%
2012	67,257	+0.21%
2017	69,105	+0.54%
2023	66,970	−0.52%

Source: EHESS and INSEE (1968-2023)

== Main sights ==
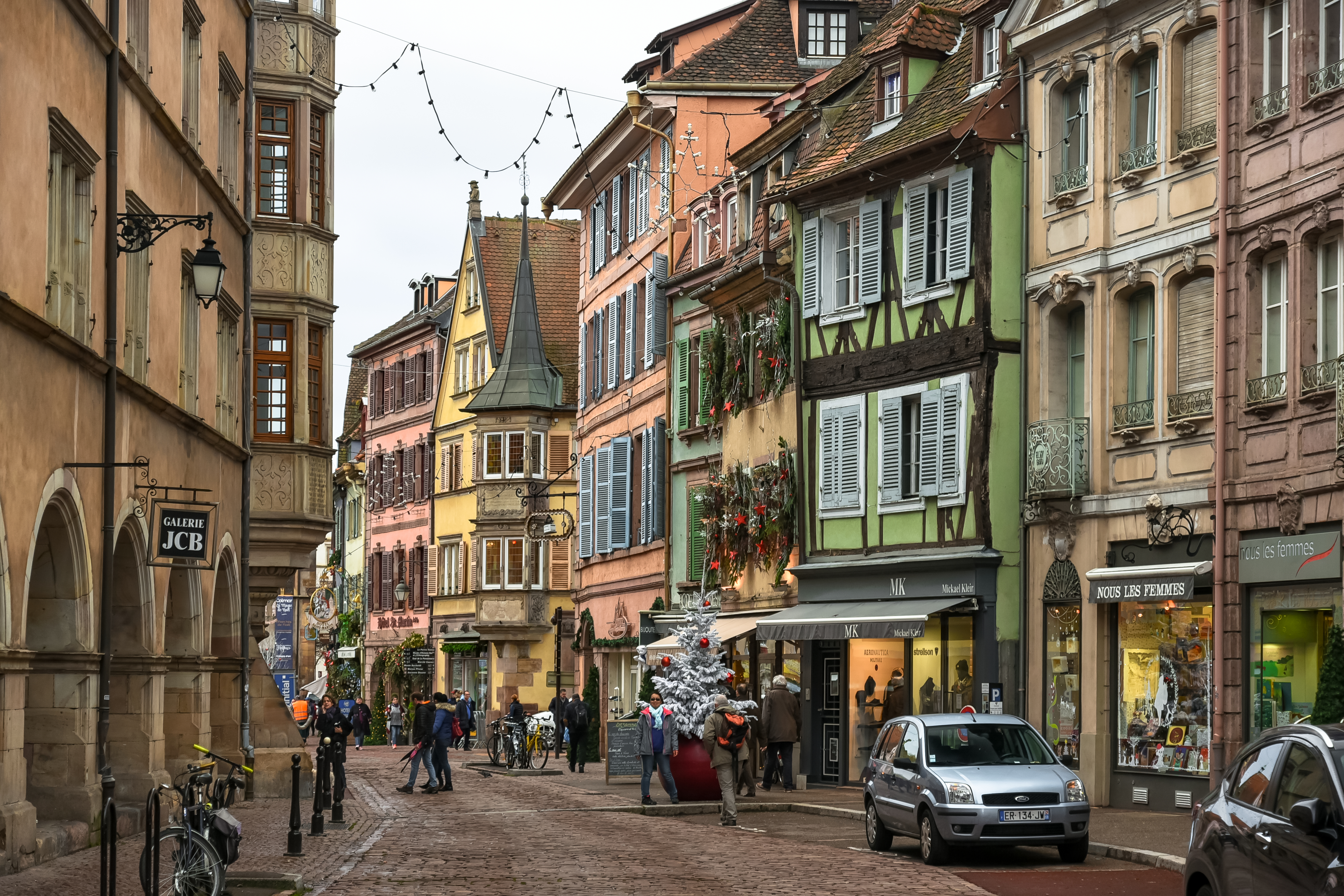
Part of the old town area

Mostly spared from the destructions of the French Revolution and the wars of 1870–1871, 1914–1918 and 1939–1945, the cityscape of old-town Colmar is homogeneous and renowned among tourists. An area that is crossed by canals of the river Lauch (which formerly served as the butcher's, tanner's and fishmonger's quarter) is now called "little Venice" (la Petite Venise).

=== Architectural landmarks ===
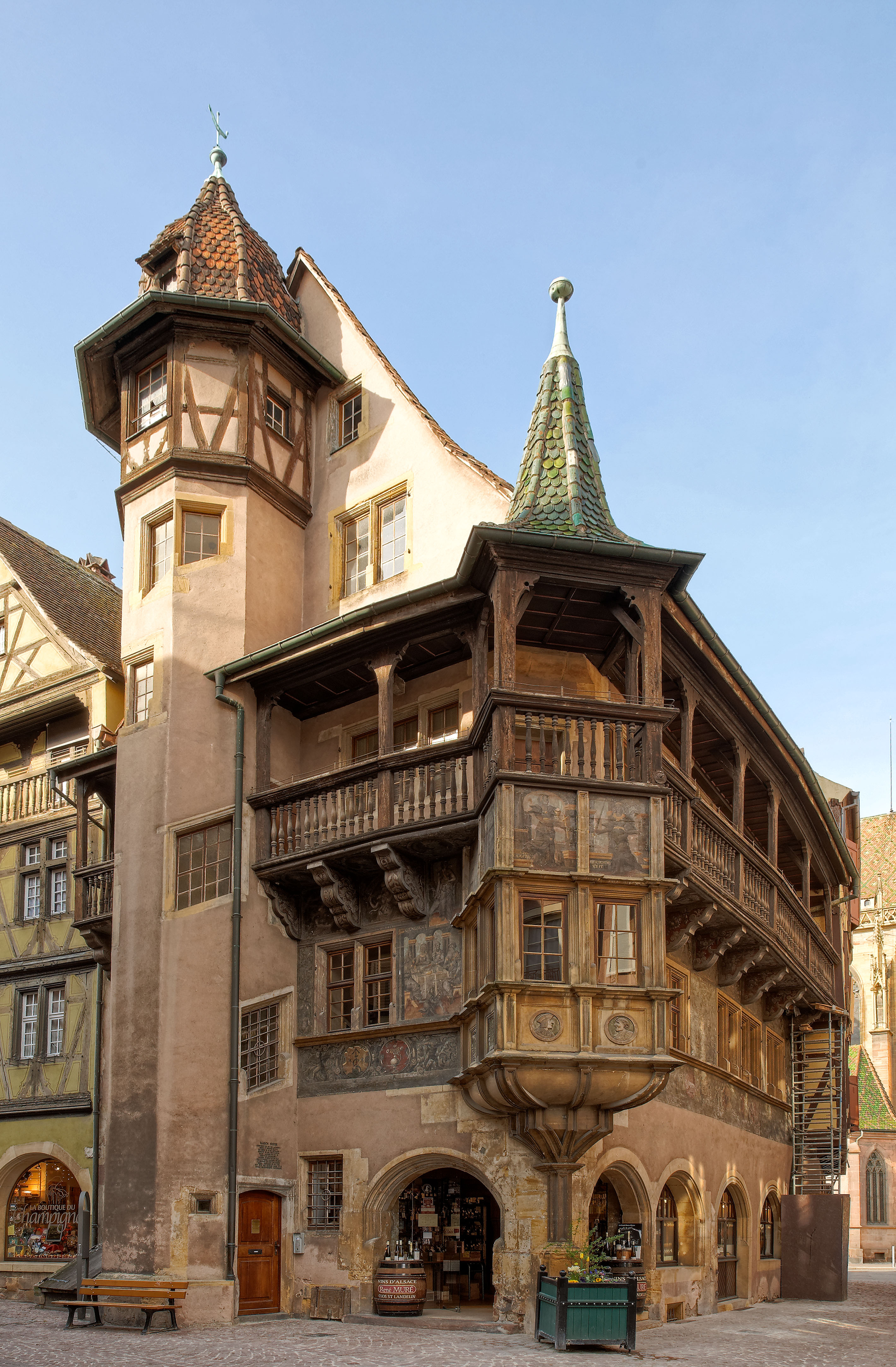
Maison Pfister. The house can easily be spotted in Howl's Moving Castle.

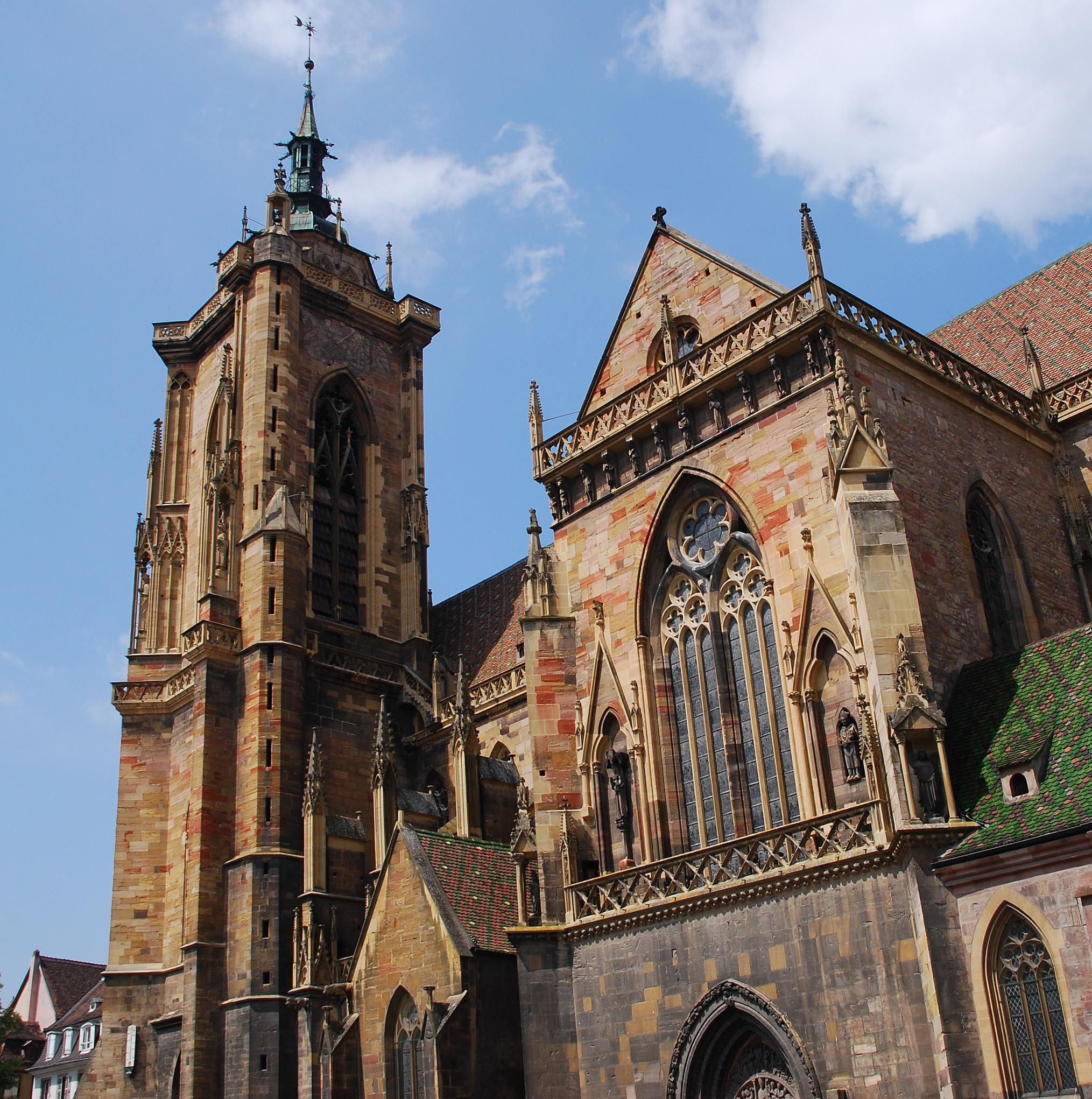
St Martin's Church, Colmar (Église Saint-Martin)

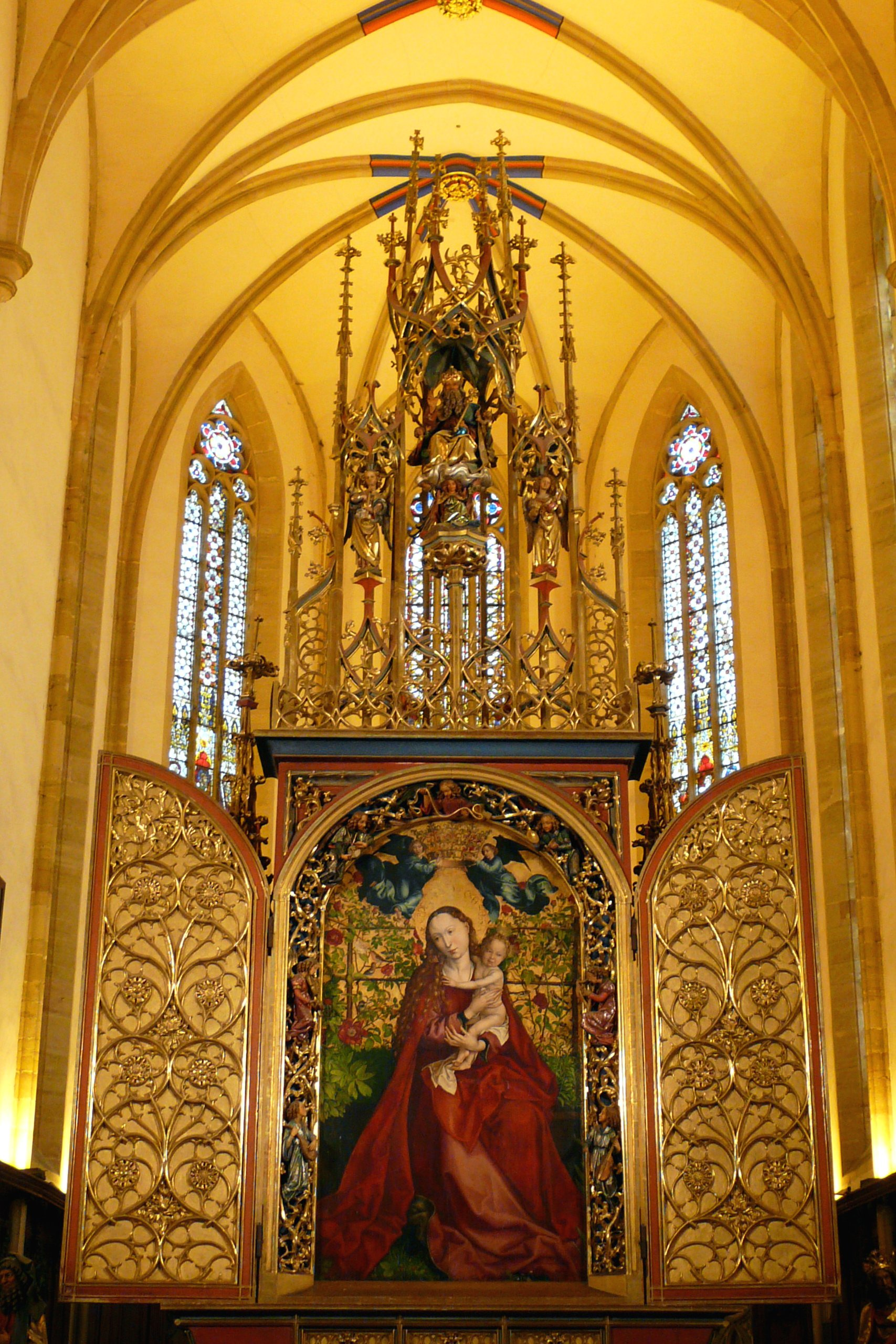
Martin Schongauer's Madonna of the Rose Bower inside the Église des Dominicains

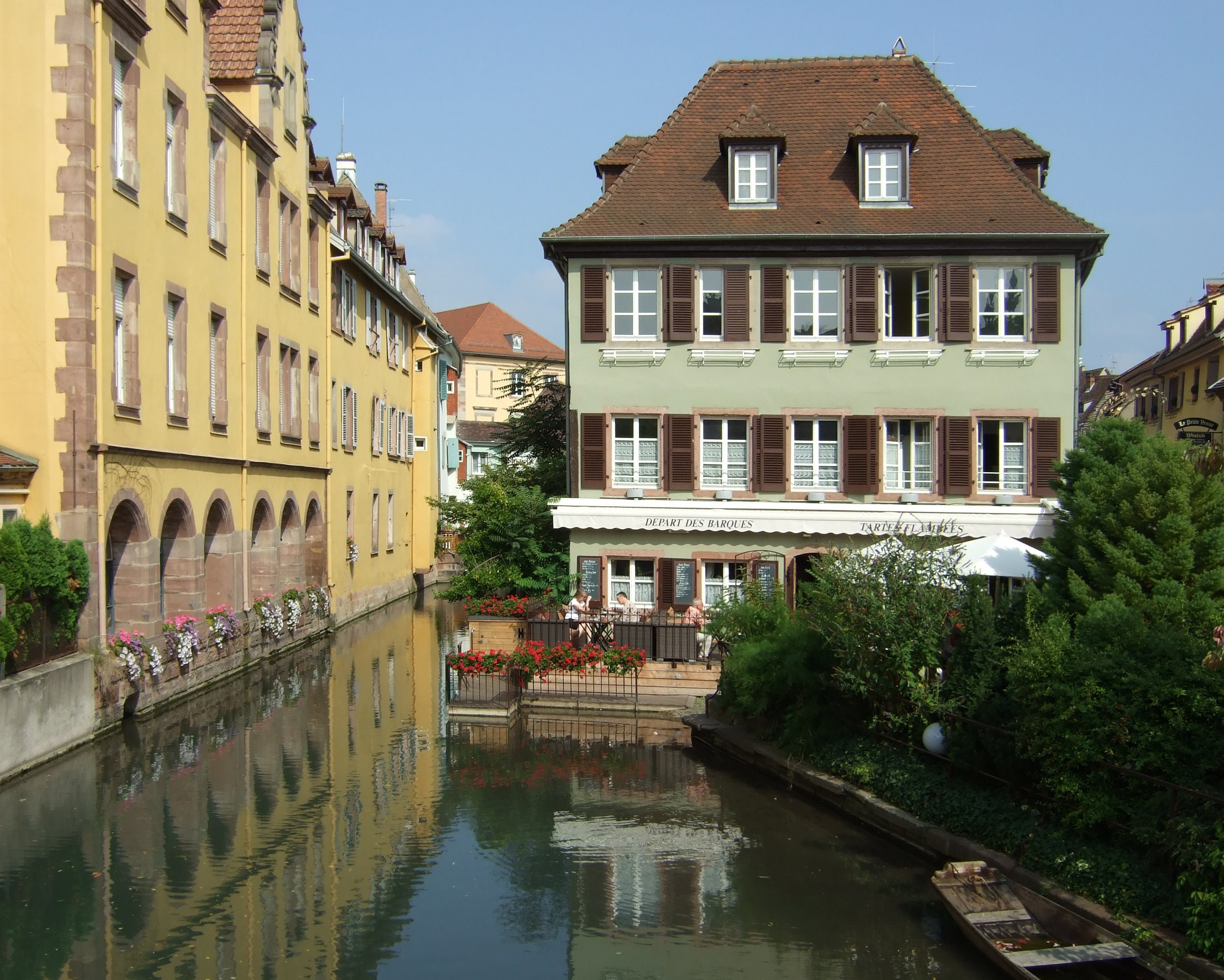
"Little Venice"

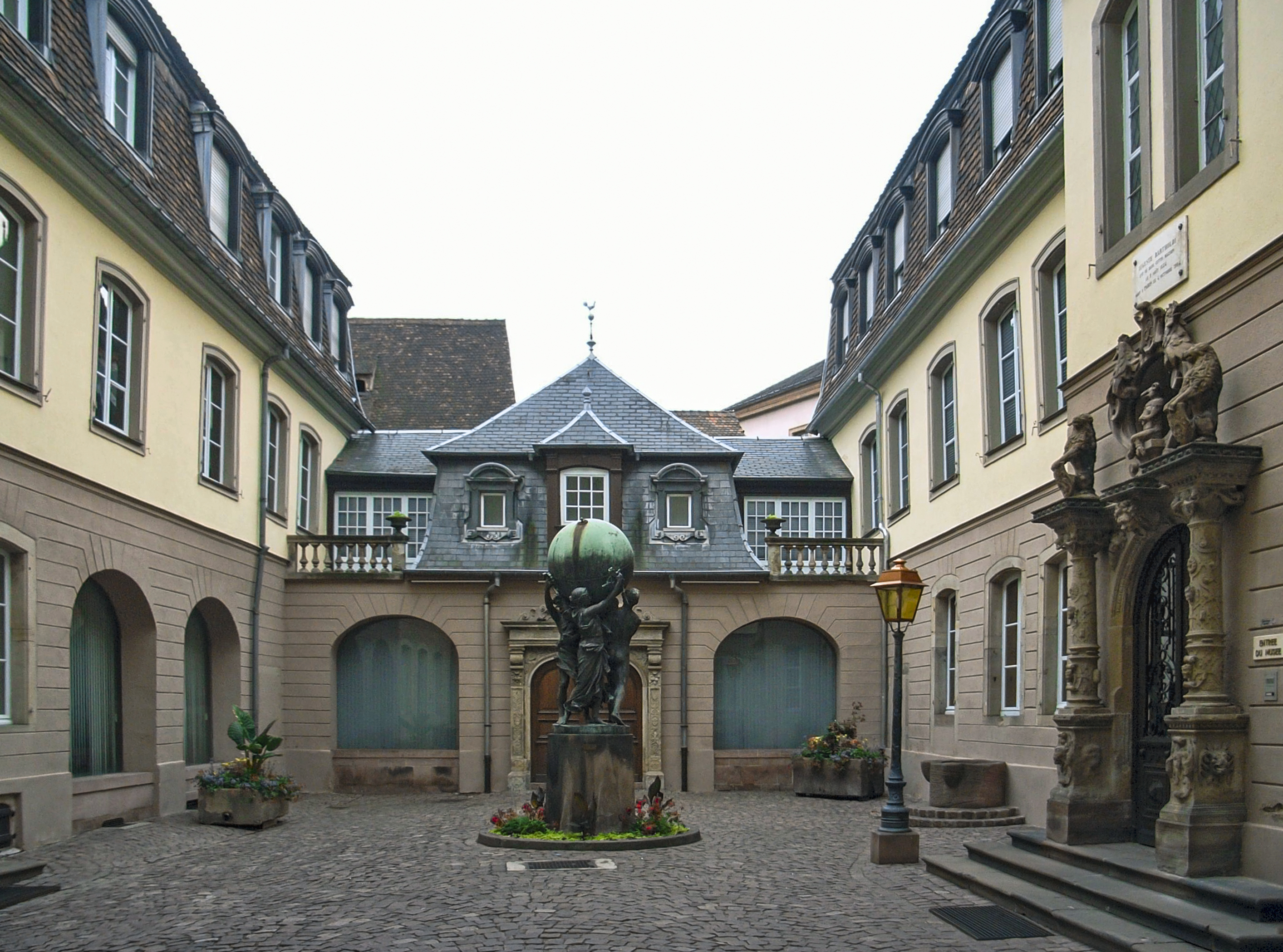
Musée Bartholdi

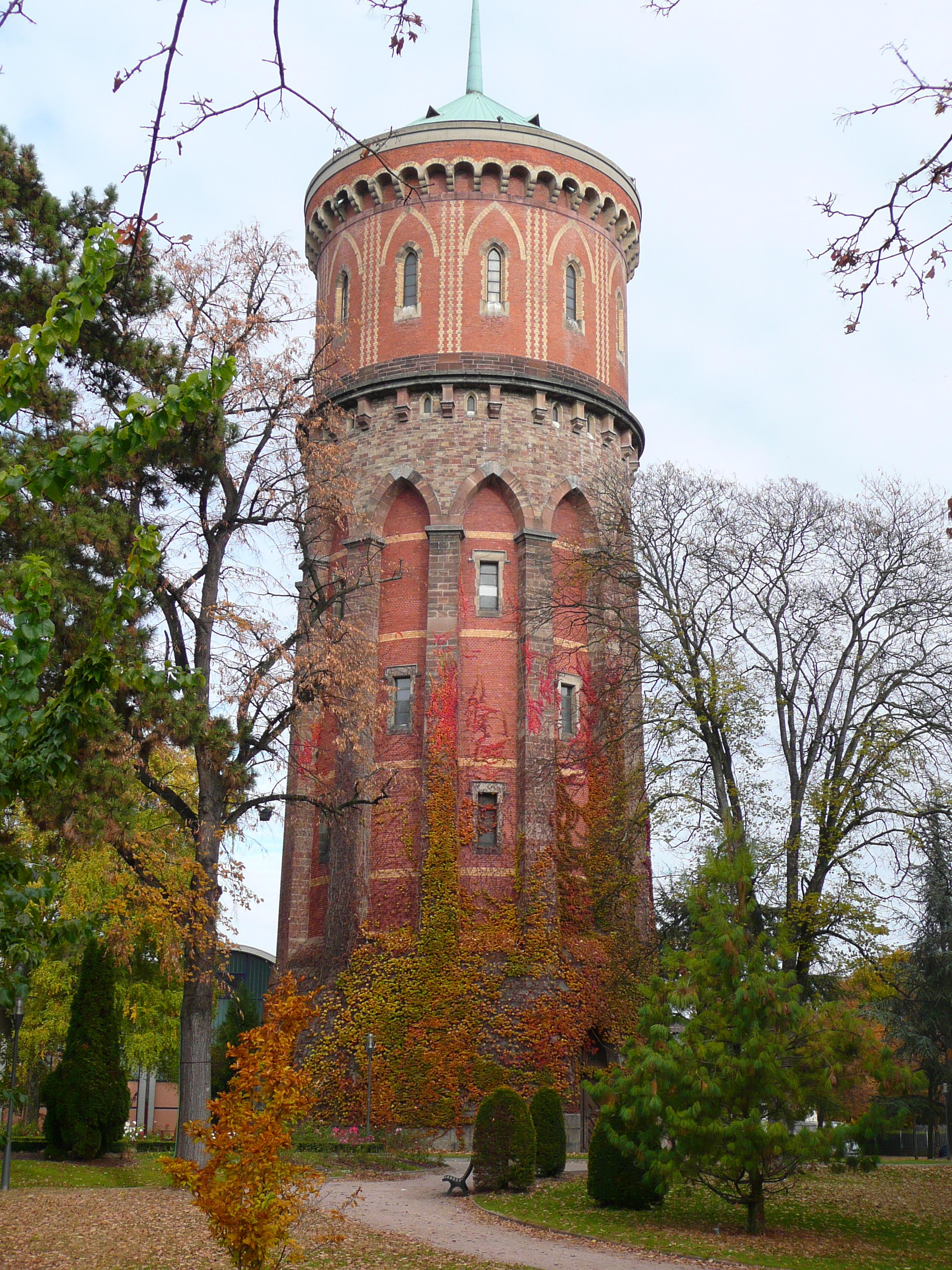
Water tower

Colmar's secular and religious architectural landmarks reflect eight centuries of Germanic and French architecture and the adaptation of their respective stylistic language to the local customs and building materials (pink and yellow Vosges sandstone, timber framing).

==== Secular buildings ====
- Maison Adolph – 14th century (German Gothic)
- Koïfhus, also known as Ancienne Douane – 1480 (German Gothic)
- Maison Pfister – 1537 (German Renaissance).
- Ancien Corps de garde – 1575 (German Renaissance)
- Maison des Chevaliers de Saint-Jean – 1608 (German Renaissance)
- Maison des Têtes – 1609 (German Renaissance)
- Poêle des laboureurs – 1626 (German Baroque)
- Ancien Hôpital – 1736–1744 (French Classicism)
- Tribunal de grande instance – 1771 (French Classicism)
- Hôtel de Ville – 1790 (French Classicism)
- Colmar prison – 1791, formerly a convent built in 1316.
- Cour d'Assises – 1840 (French Neoclassicism)
- Théâtre municipal – 1849 (French Neoclassicism)
- Marché couvert – 1865 (French Neo-Baroque). The city's covered market, built in stone, bricks and cast iron, still serves today.
- Préfecture – 1866 (French Neo-Baroque)
- Water tower – 1886. Oldest still preserved water tower in Alsace. Out of use since 1984.
- Gare SNCF – 1905 (German Neo-Baroque)
- Cour d'appel – 1906 (German Neo-Baroque)

==== Religious buildings ====
- Église Saint-Martin – 1234–1365. The largest church of Colmar and one of the largest in Haut-Rhin. Displays some early stained glass windows, several Gothic and Renaissance sculptures and altars, a grand Baroque organ case. The choir is surrounded by an ambulatory opening on a series of Gothic chapels, a unique feature in Alsatian churches.
- Église des Dominicains – 1289–1364. Now deconsecrated as a church, displays Martin Schongauer's masterwork Madonna of the Rose Bower as well as 14th century stained glass windows and baroque choir stalls. The adjacent convent buildings house a section of the municipal library.
- Église Saint-Matthieu – 13th century. Gothic and Renaissance stained glass windows and mural paintings, as well as a wooden and painted ceiling.
- Couvent des Antonins – 13th century. Deconsecrated church and convent buildings notable for a richly ornate cloister. Now housing the Unterlinden Museum (see below).
- Église Sainte-Catherine – 1371. Deconsecrated church and convent buildings now used as an assembly hall and festival venue (Salle des Catherinettes).
- Chapelle Saint-Pierre – 1742–1750. Classicist chapel of a former Jesuit college.
- Synagogue – 1843 (Neoclassicism)

==== Fountains ====
- Fontaine de l'Amiral Bruat – 1864 (Statue by Bartholdi)
- Fontaine Roeselmann – 1888 (Statue by Bartholdi)
- Fontaine Schwendi – 1898 (Statue by Bartholdi)

==== Monuments ====
- Monument du Général Rapp – 1856 (first shown 1855 in Paris. Statue by Bartholdi, his earliest major work)
- Monument Hirn – 1894 (Statue by Bartholdi)
- Statue Les grands soutiens du monde − 1902 (in the courtyard of the Bartholdi Museum)
- Statue of Liberty (Liberty Enlightening the World) replica

=== Museums ===
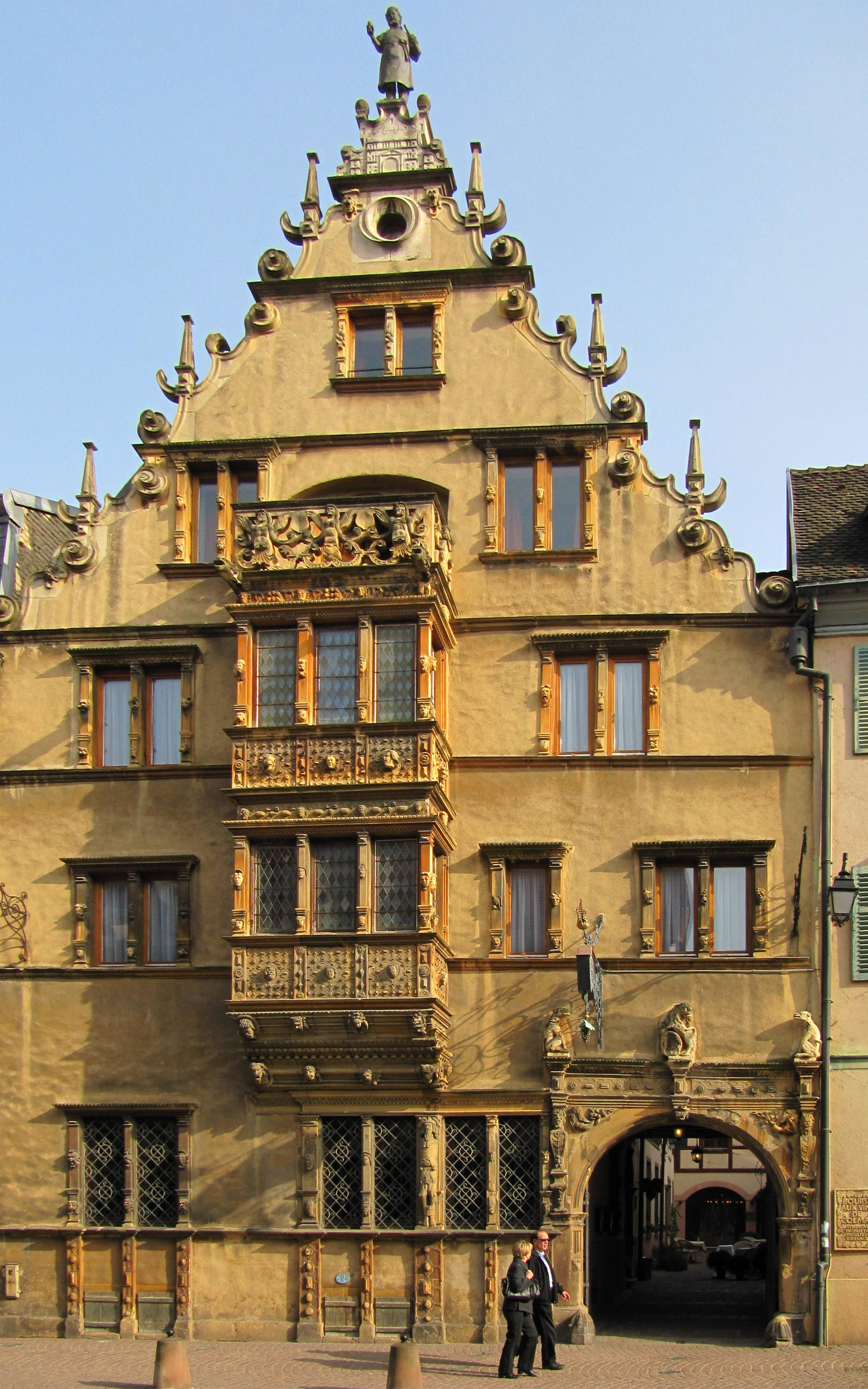
Maison des têtes

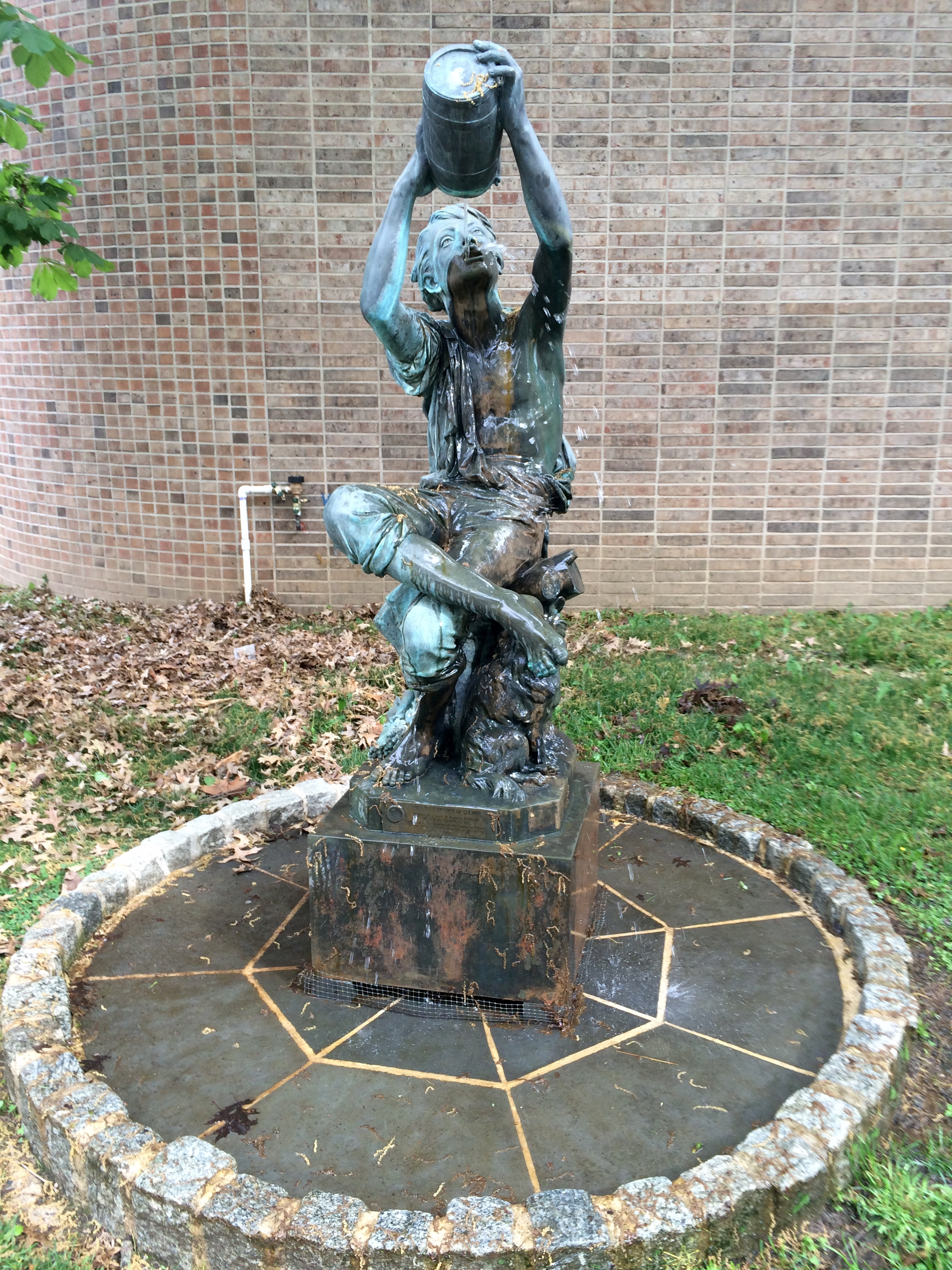
A replica of The Little Vintner of Colmar by Frédéric Auguste Bartholdi, given by the town of Colmar to Princeton, its sister city, in 1988

- Unterlinden Museum – one of the main museums in Alsace. Displays the Isenheim Altarpiece, a large collection of medieval, Renaissance and baroque Upper-Rhenish paintings and sculptures, archaeological artefacts, design and international modern art.
- Musée Bartholdi – the birthplace of Frédéric Auguste Bartholdi shows his life and work through paintings, drawings, family objects and furniture as well as numerous plaster, metal and stone sculptures. A section of the museum is further dedicated to the local Jewish community's heritage.
- Musée d'histoire naturelle et d'ethnographie – the zoological and ethnographic museum of Colmar was founded in 1859. Besides a large collection of taxidermied animals, and artefacts from former French and German colonies in Africa and Polynesia, it also houses a collection of ancient Egyptian items.
- Musée du jouet – the town's toy museum, founded 1993.
- Musée des usines municipales – industrial and technological museum in a former factory, dedicated to the history of everyday technology.
- Choco-Story Colmar - museum presenting the history of chocolate, with regional history displays, the ability to taste different chocolates and artworks made of chocolate.

=== Library ===
The Municipal Library of Colmar (Bibliothèque municipale de Colmar) owns one of the richest collections of incunabula in France, with more than 2,300 volumes. This is an exceptional number for a city that is neither the main seat of a university, nor of a college, and has its explanation in the dissolution of local monasteries, abbeys and convents during the French Revolution and the subsequent gift of their collections to the town.

== Transport ==
The small regional Colmar Airport serves Colmar. The nearest international airports are EuroAirport Basel Mulhouse Freiburg which is located 52 km away and Strasbourg Airport located 68 km away from Colmar.

The railway station Gare de Colmar offers connections to Strasbourg, Mulhouse, Besançon, Zürich and several regional destinations. Colmar was also once linked to Freiburg im Breisgau, in Germany and on the other side of the Rhine, by the Freiburg–Colmar international railway. However the railway bridge over the Rhine between Breisach and Neuf-Brisach was destroyed in 1945 and never replaced.

== Education ==
Senior high schools in Colmar include:

- Lycée Bartholdi
- Lycée Camille Sée
- Lycée polyvalent Blaise Pascal
- Lycée polyvalent Martin Schongauer
- Lycée privé Saint-André
- Lycée professionnel privé Saint-Jean
- École privée Mathias Grunewald

Colmar shares the Université de Haute-Alsace (Upper Alsace University) with the neighbouring, larger city of Mulhouse. Of the approximately 8,000 students of the UHA, around 1,500 study at the Institut universitaire de technologie (IUT) Colmar, at the Colmar branch of the Faculté des Sciences et Techniques and at the Unité de Formation et de Recherche Pluridisciplinaire d'Enseignement Professionalisé Supérieur (UFR PEPS).

The École Compleméntaire Pour L'Enseignement Japonaise à Colmar (コルマール補習授業校 Korumāru Hoshū Jugyō Kō), a part-time supplementary Japanese school, is held in Colmar. At one time classes were held at the Centre Cultural de Seijo.

== Music ==
Since 1980, Colmar is home to an international summer festival of classical music Festival de Colmar (also known as Festival international de musique classique de Colmar). In its first version (1980 to 1989), it was placed under the artistic direction of the German conductor Karl Münchinger. Since 1989, it is helmed by the Russian violinist and conductor Vladimir Spivakov.

== Economy ==
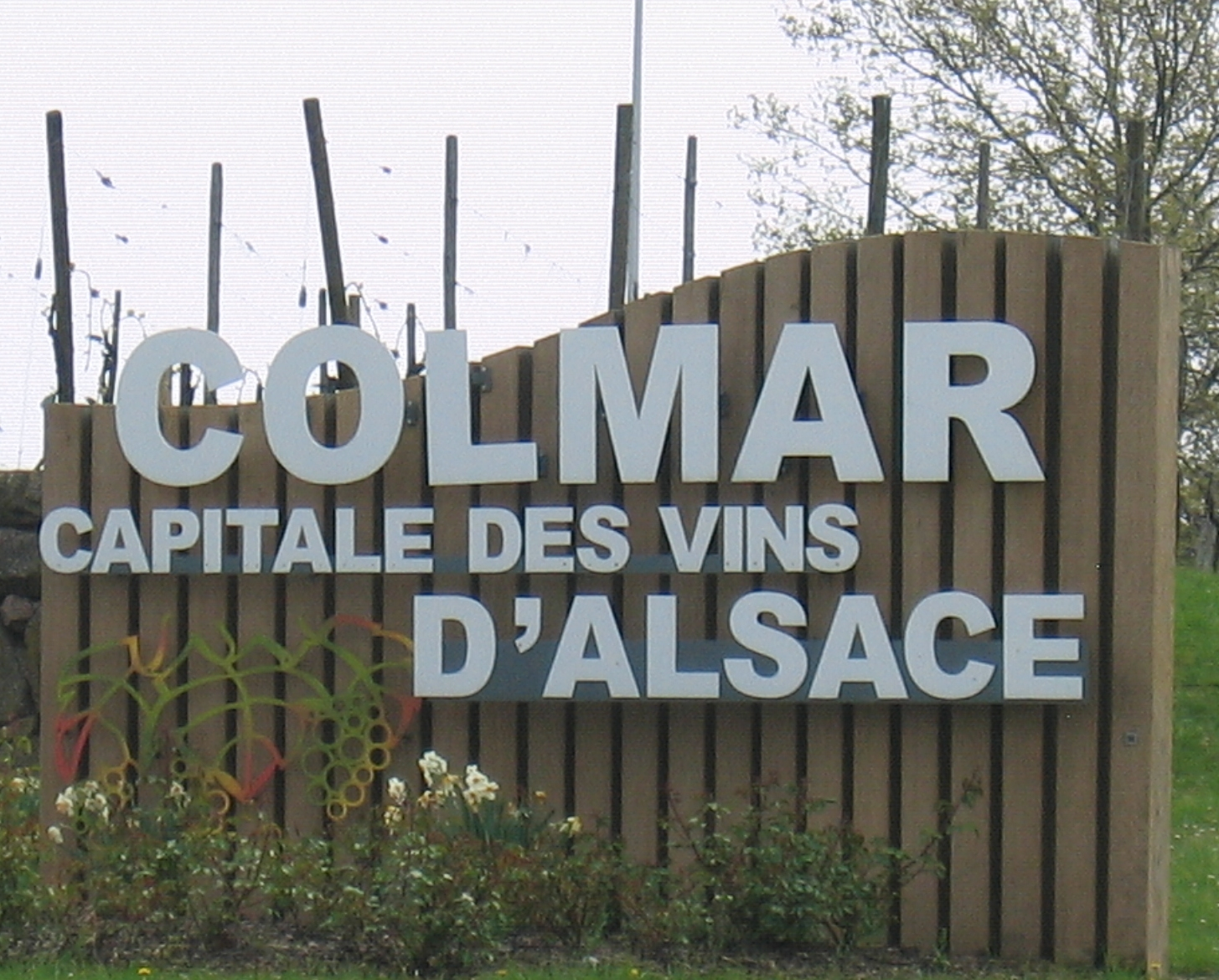
Colmar: capital of Alsatian wines

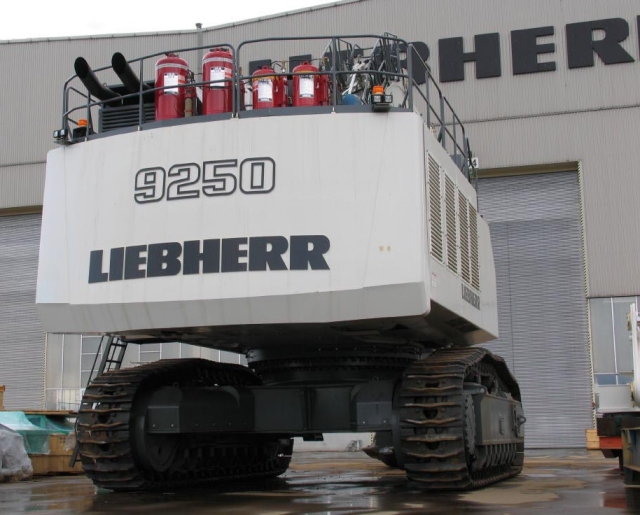
Liebherr in Colmar

Colmar is an affluent city whose primary economic strength lies in the flourishing tourist industry. But it is also the seat of several large companies: Timken (European seat), Liebherr (French seat), Leitz (French seat), Capsugel France (A division of Pfizer).

Every year since 1947, Colmar is host to what is now considered as the biggest annual commercial event as well as the largest festival in Alsace, the Foire aux vins d'Alsace (Alsacian wine fair).

When Air Alsace existed, its head office was on the grounds of Colmar Airport.

== Parks and recreation ==
By 1991 Lycée Seijo, a Japanese boarding high school in Kientzheim, had established a Japanese cultural center. It housed books and printed materials in Japan and hosted lectures and film screenings.

=== Sports ===
Colmar has the following notable sports organizations, accommodations and events.

- SR Colmar, a football club
- Ladhof Stadium, a football field
- Paris-Colmar, a racewalking competition

== Notable people ==
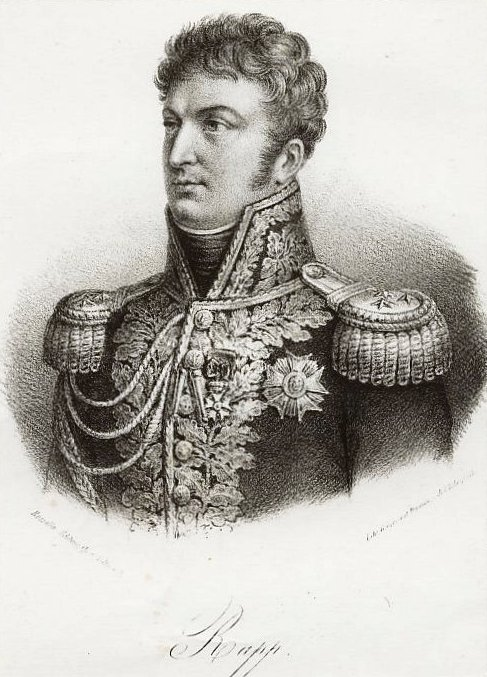
Jean Rapp

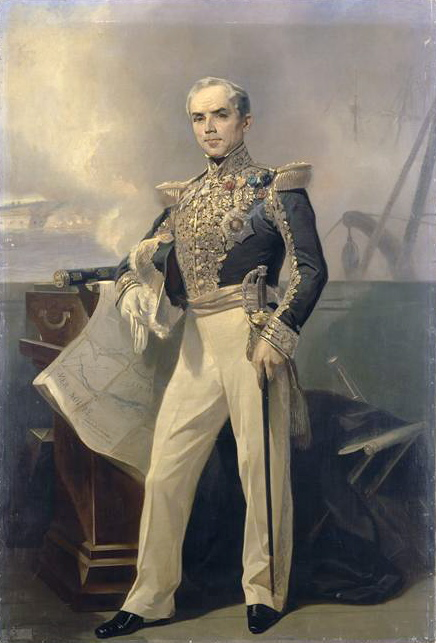
Armand Joseph Bruat, amiral de France

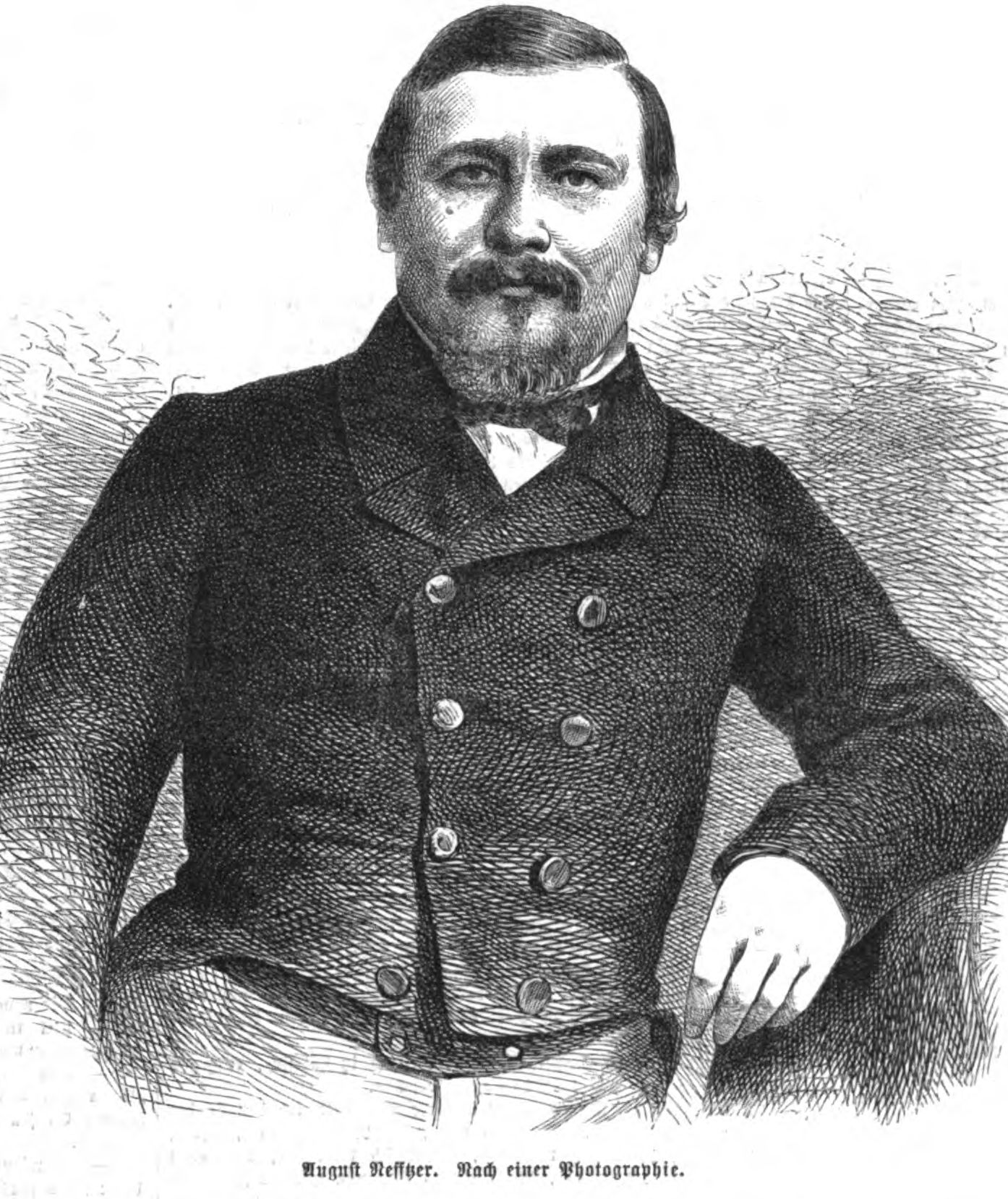
Auguste Nefftzer, 1863

- Caspar Isenmann (1410? – 1484?), painter
- Martin Schongauer (1450–1491), painter and engraver
- Georg Wickram (1502–1562), poet and novelist
- Jean-François Rewbell (1747–1807), diplomat and revolutionist
- Jean Rapp (1771–1821), lieutenant general
- Conrad Berg (1785–1852), composer
- Charles Xavier Thomas (1785–1870), inventor
- Marie Bigot (1786–1820), musician, pianist and composer, friend of Haydn and Beethoven
- Armand Joseph Bruat (1796–1855), admiral
- Georges-Charles de Heeckeren d'Anthès (1812–1895), politician, killer of Alexander Pushkin in a duel
- Auguste Nefftzer (1820–1876), journalist
- Frédéric Auguste Bartholdi (1834–1904), sculptor. He created Liberty Enlightening the World (the Statue of Liberty).
- Camille Sée (1847–1919), politician
- Jean-Baptiste Lemire (1867–1945), composer
- Jean-Jacques Waltz (1873–1951), drawer and caricaturist
- Ernst Stadler (1883–1914), Alsatian poet
- Paul Wormser (1905–1944), Olympic épée fencer
- Hans Loewald (1906–1993), psychoanalyst and theorist
- Jean-Pierre Muller (1924–2008), Olympic epee fencer
- Bernard Schmitt (1929–2014), economist and founder of the "Quantum Economics"
- Christian de Chergé (1937-1996), Trappist monk and one of the Tibhirine monks
- Guy Roux (born 1938), football coach
- Pierre Moerlen (1952–2005), musician, drummer and composer
- Pierre Hermé (born 1961), confectioner, entrepreneur and pastry chef
- Thomas Bloch (born 1962), musician
- Éric Straumann (born 1964), politician
- Pascal Elbé (born 1967), actor, director and screenwriter
- Marc Keller (born 1968), football player
- Cendrine Wolf (born 1969), children's author
- Pascal Johansen (born 1979), football player
- Nicolas Armindo (born 1982), racing driver
- Amaury Bischoff (born 1987), football player
- Fabien Schmidt (born 1989), professional cyclist
- Ryad Boudebouz (born 1990), Algerian-French footballer
- Robin Risser (born 2004), football player

== International relations ==
=== Twin towns – sister cities ===
Colmar is twinned with:

- Schongau, Bavaria, Germany (1962)
- Hyde, England, United Kingdom (1962)
- Lucca, Italy (1962)
- Princeton, United States (1986)
- Győr, Hungary (1993)
- Sint-Niklaas, Belgium (1962)
- Vale of White Horse, England, United Kingdom (1978)
- Eisenstadt, Austria (1983)

=== Replicas of historical buildings in Malaysia ===
Bukit Tinggi Resort Colmar Tropicale which is situated in Bentong district, State of Pahang, Malaysia is a resort-theme historical village inspires from the original Colmar commune in France. Colmar Tropicale located 60 km north-east of Kuala Lumpur.

North of it, a rebuild of Château du Haut-Kœnigsbourg is in the Berjaya Hills, hosting an organic resort hotel.

== In popular culture ==
Colmar's cityscape (and that of neighbouring Riquewihr) served as inspiration for the design of the Japanese animated film Howl's Moving Castle. It is also celebrated as one of the real-life inspirations for Belle’s provincial hometown in Disney’s 1991 animated classic Beauty and the Beast. Scenes in the anime Is the Order a Rabbit? are also based on this location.

Colmar appears as a map in Day of Defeat: Source set in 1944. Germans and American soldiers try to blow up each other's objectives.

== See also ==
- List of mayors of Colmar
