= Jean-Pierre Muller (fencer) =

French fencer

Personal information
- Born: 29 August 1924 Colmar, France
- Died: 1 July 2008 (aged 83) Colmar, France

Sport
- Sport: Fencing

Jean-Pierre Muller (29 August 1924 – 1 July 2008) was a French fencer. He competed in the team épée event at the 1952 Summer Olympics.
