= Lycée Camille Sée (Colmar) =

School in France

Lycée Camille Sée is a senior high school/sixth-form college in Colmar, Haut-Rhin, France.

The school includes a boarding facility.
