= Caspar Isenmann =

German painter

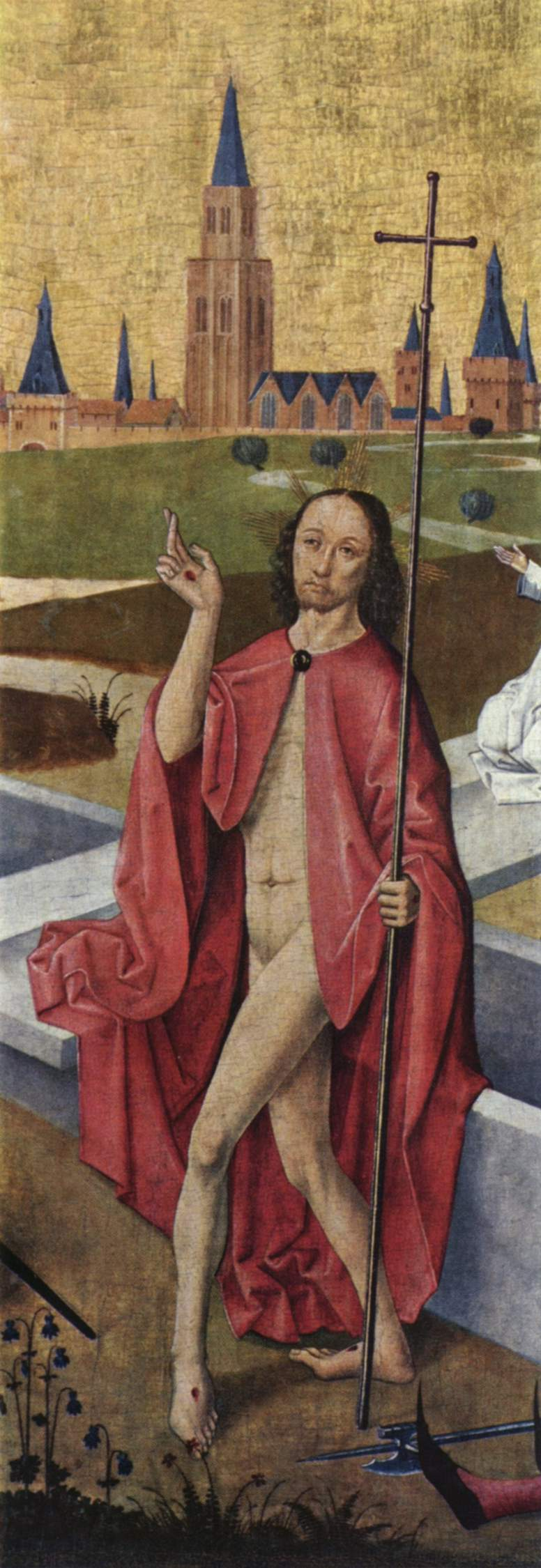
- Born: ca. 1410 probably Colmar
- Died: 18 January 1472 or between 1484 and 1490; Colmar
- Known for: paintings
- Notable work: Altarpiece for St Martin's Church (1462–1465)
- Style: Gothic

Caspar (or Kaspar) Isenmann (French: Gaspard Isenmann) was a Gothic painter from Alsace. As the municipal painter of his hometown Colmar and the creator of a major altarpiece for the prestigious St Martin's Church, he was an important representative of the Upper Rhenish school of painting of the mid-15th century and a probable master of Martin Schongauer.

== Life and work ==
Isenmann's dates of birth and death are uncertain. He may have been born around 1410. The Unterlinden Museum of his hometown indicates that he was active around 1430 and died between 1484 and 1490; however the Bibliothèque nationale de France states that Isenmann died on 18 January 1472.

Isenmann was first recorded as a painter in 1432. He decorated the municipal counting board in 1433 and became a burgher of Colmar in 1435 or 1436. Nothing is known about his teachers but it is assumed that he may have been apprenticed either to Hans Hirtz of Strasbourg or Konrad Witz of Basel; his art also shows the influence of Rogier van der Weyden and his school. After 1450, Isenmann is registered as an alderman (Schöffe) and in 1461, he is one of the main organizers of a Mystery play during Corpus Christi.

In 1462, Isenmann received a commission to paint a set of panels (oil on fir wood) for the high altar of St Martin's Church, Colmar's main place of worship, and he delivered the finished altarpiece in 1465. Seven of these panels, some mutilated, have survived after the altarpiece was dismantled in 1720 and since 1853 have been housed at the Unterlinden Museum. The contract from 1462, detailing the commission of the altarpiece, survives and is kept in the municipal archive of Colmar. It was signed on 21 June 1462; the painter was guaranteed a payment of 500 guilder and requested to complete work in two years, i. e. in 1464. It is not known if the delay in the actual delivery did cost the painter anything.

Between 1466 and 1469, Isenmann may have been the teacher of fellow Colmarian, Martin Schongauer, whom he acquainted with van der Weyden's paintings. He is also assumed to have taught Martin's brother Ludwig Schongauer.

A house in 34, rue des Marchands in Colmar bears the inscription "Zum grienen hus, 1435. Ancienne demeure du maître-peintre Caspar Isenmann" (At the green house, 1435, former dwelling of the master painter Caspar Isenmann).

== See also ==
- Jost Haller, Isenmann's colleague from Strasbourg

== Gallery ==
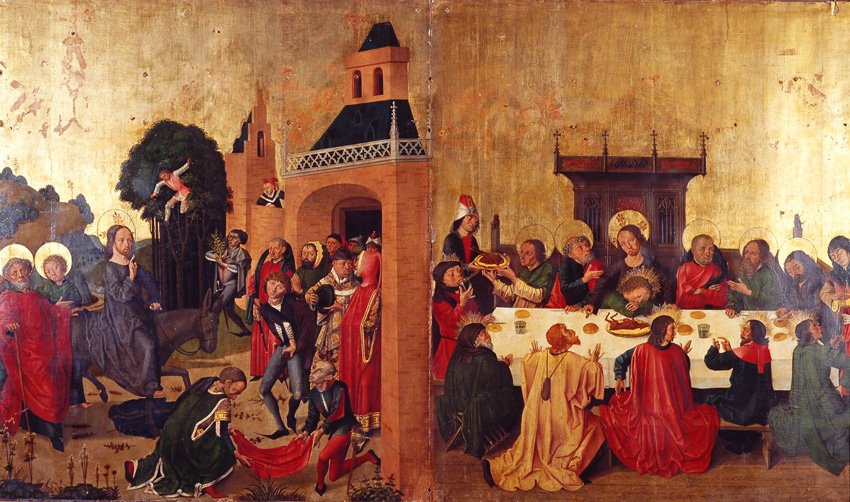
Triumphal entry into Jerusalem; Last Supper (details from the Colmar Altarpiece)

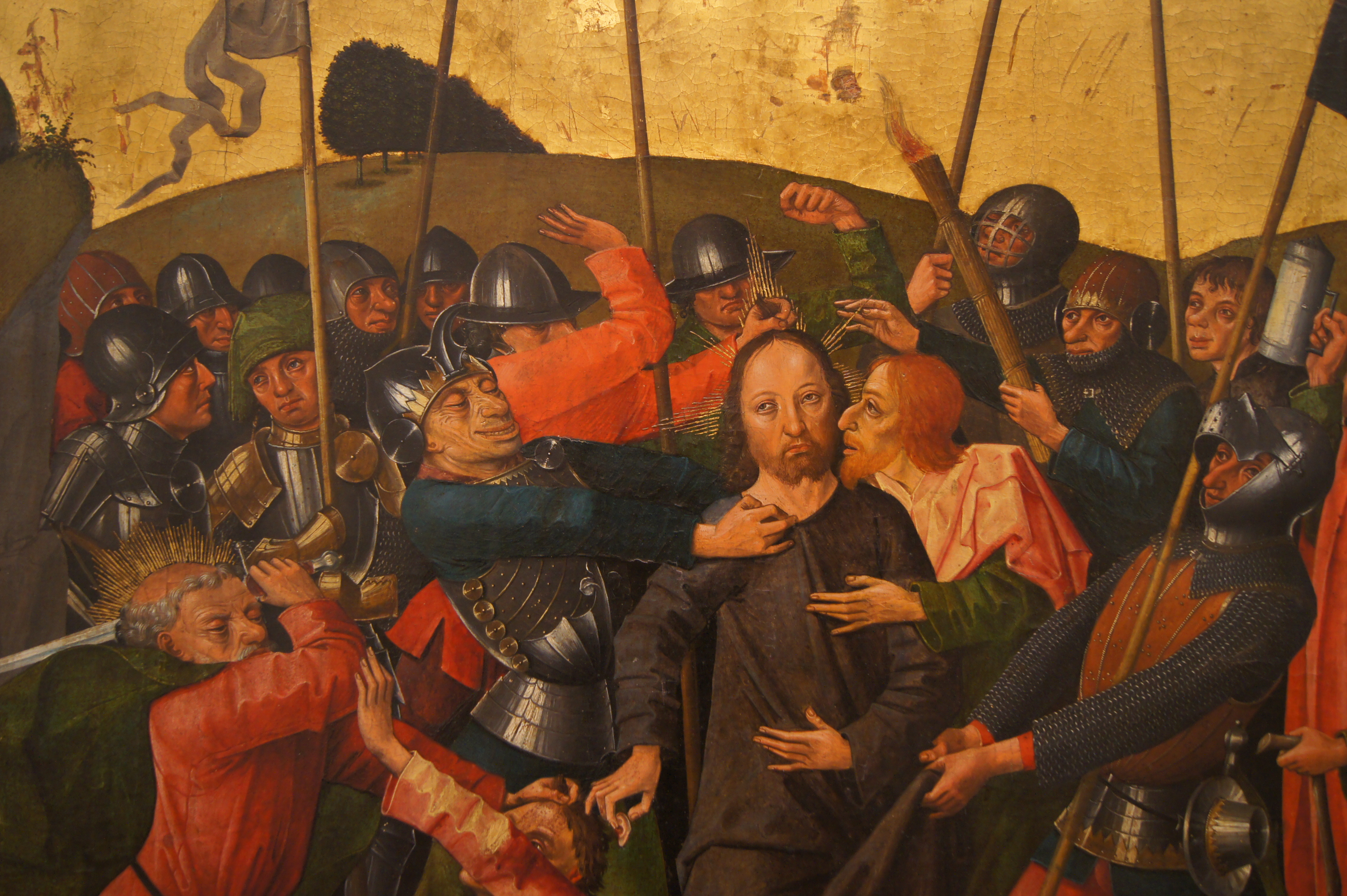
Arrest of Jesus (detail from the Colmar Altarpiece)

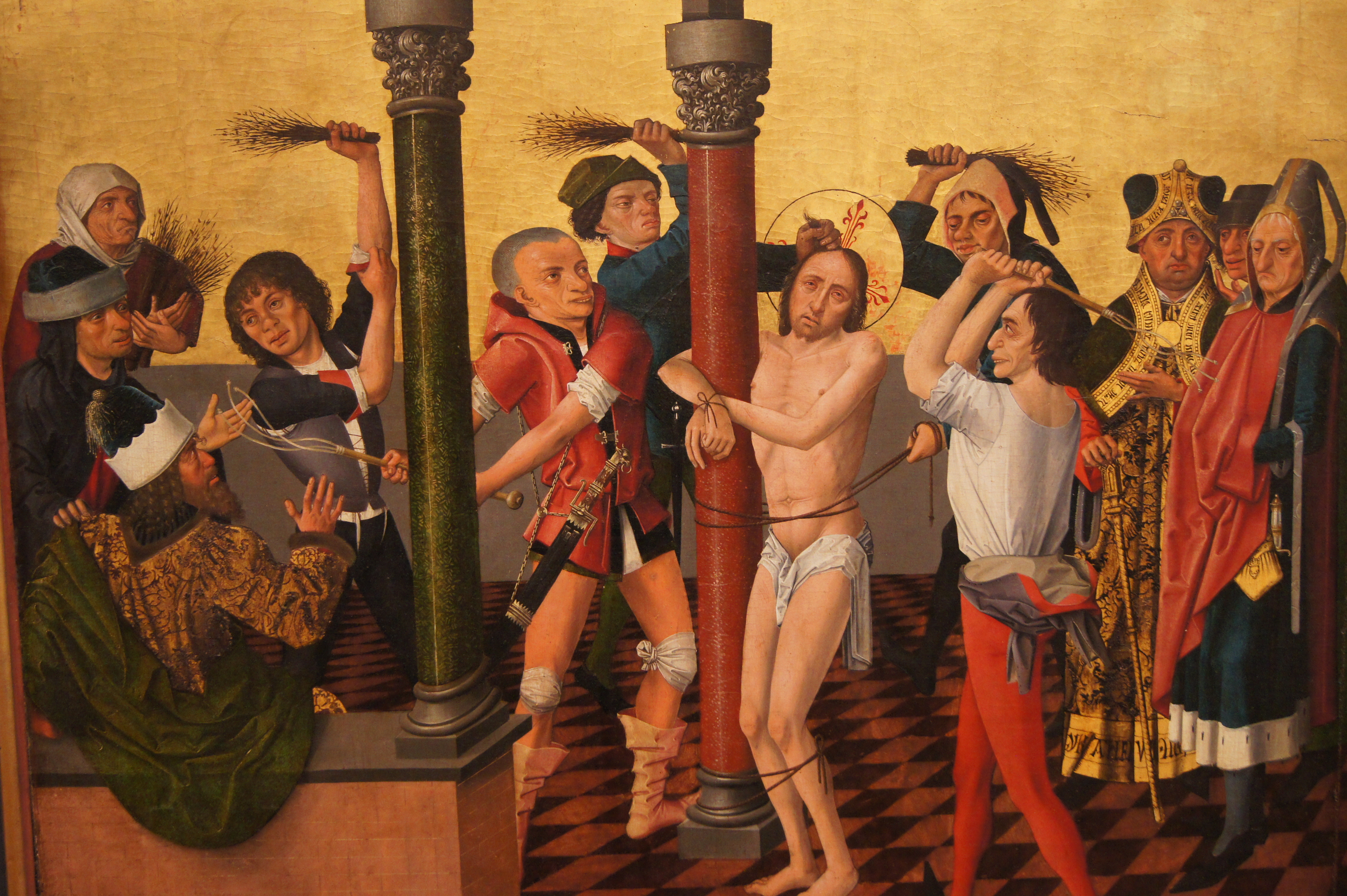
Flagellation of Christ (detail from the Colmar Altarpiece)

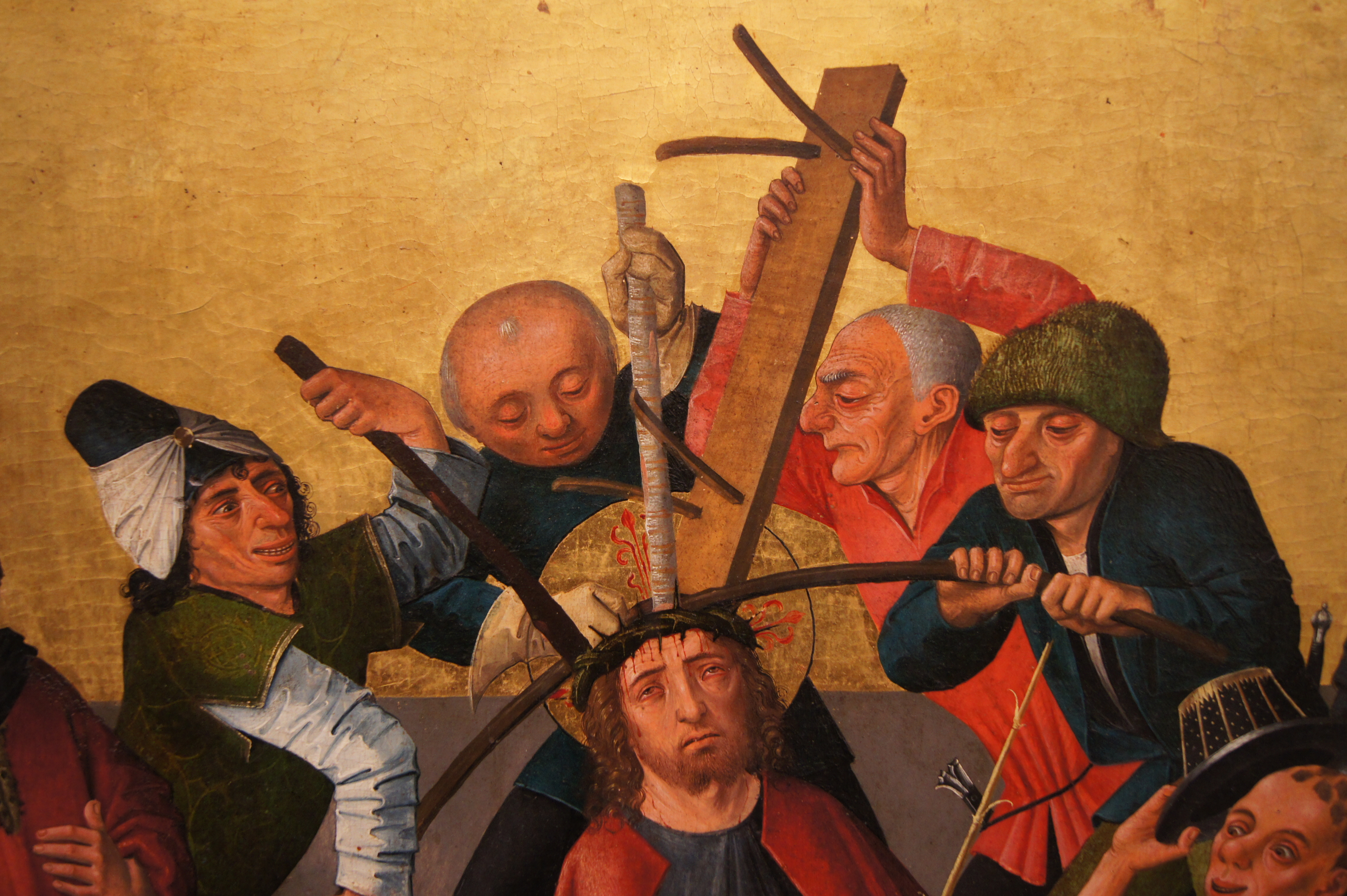
The Crown of thorns (detail from the Colmar Altarpiece)

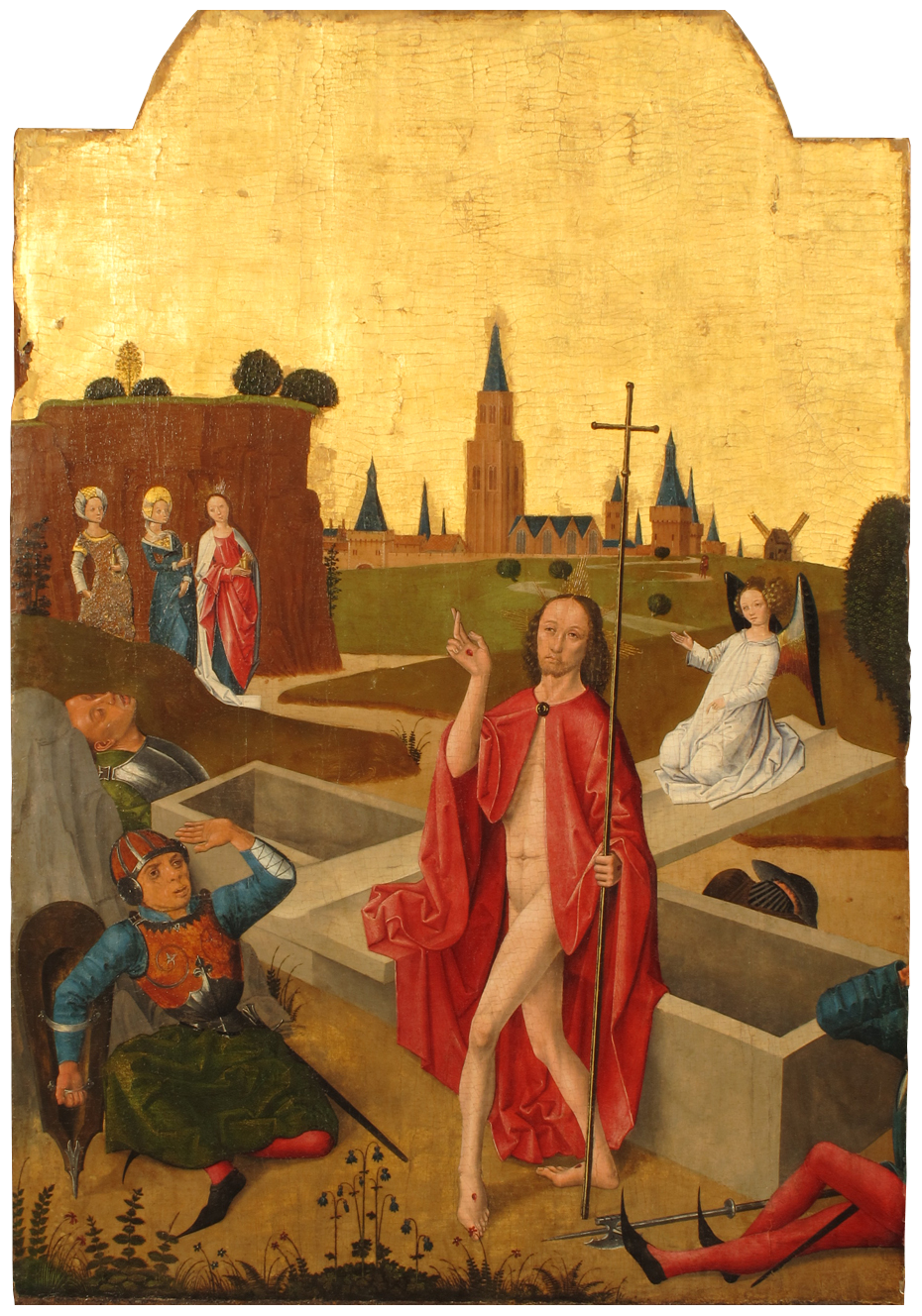
Resurrection of Jesus (detail from the Colmar Altarpiece). The mutilation of the panel can most clearly be seen at the lower right.
