= Jost Haller =

German painter

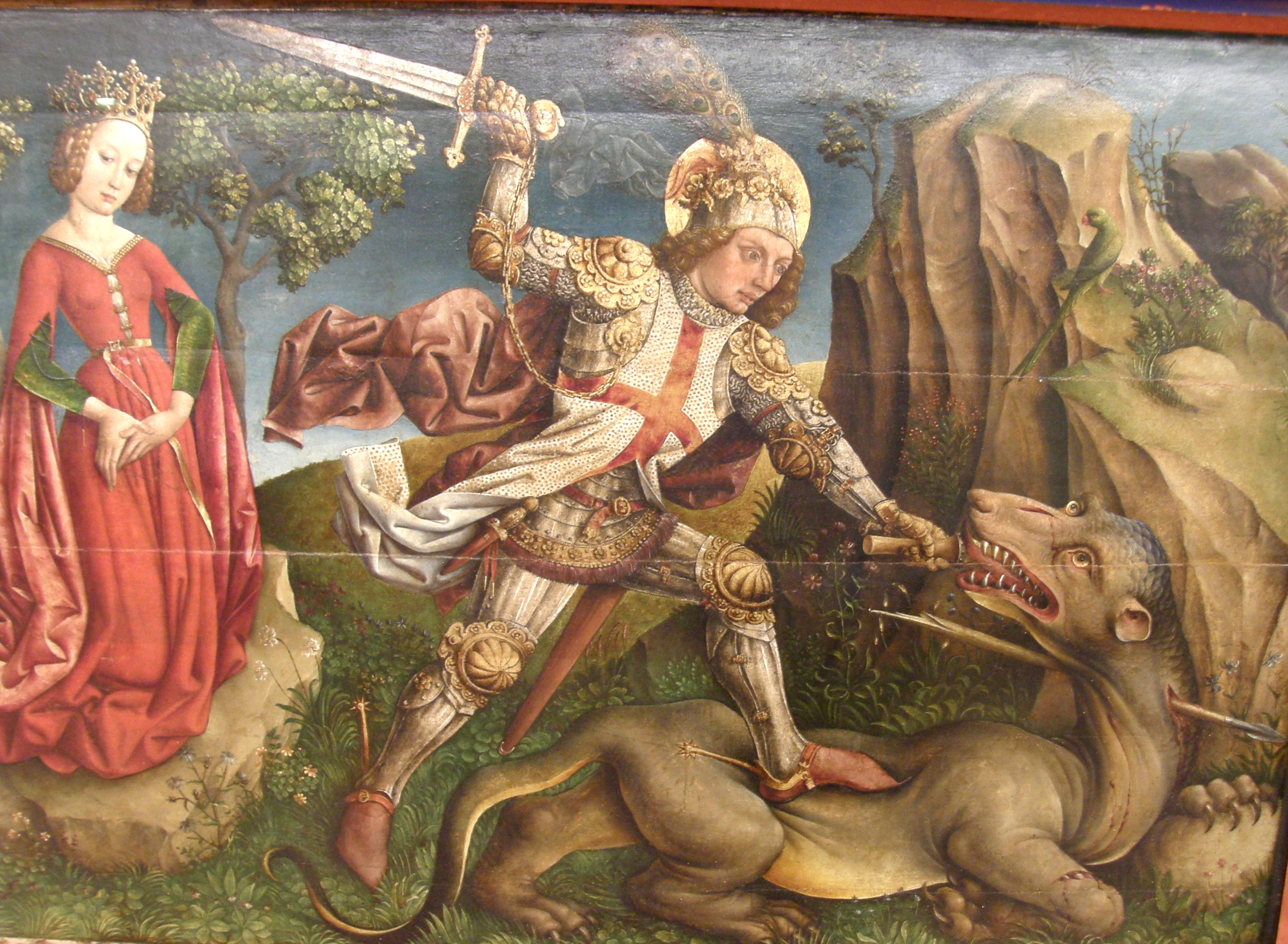
- Saint George slaying the dragon, from the Tempelhof Altarpiece
- Born: 1410s
- Died: 1470s
- Known for: paintings
- Notable work: Tempelhof Altarpiece (ca. 1445)
- Style: Gothic

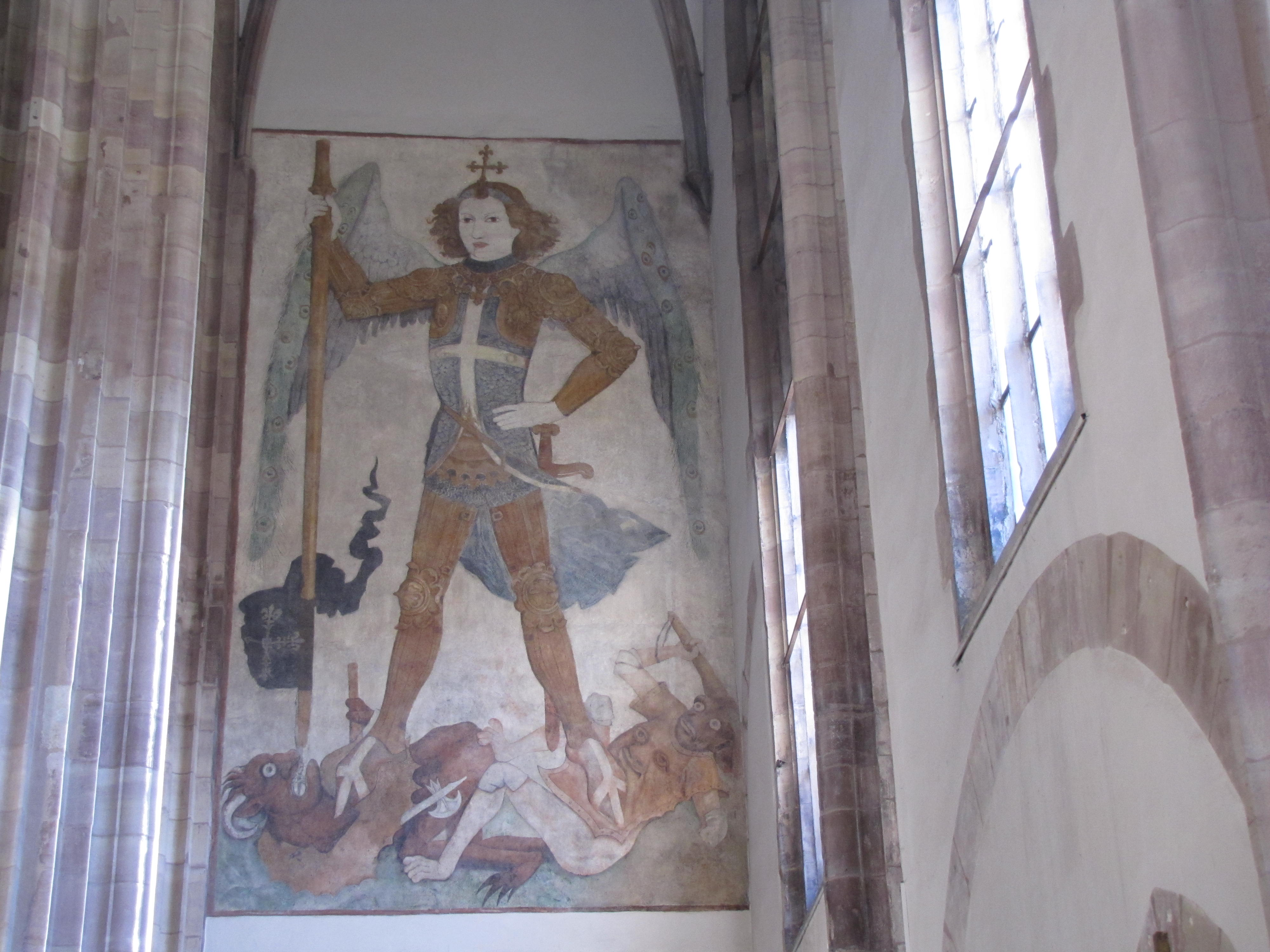
Saint Michael defeating Satan

Jost Haller was a 15th-century Gothic painter from Alsace, active in the years 1440–1470, first established in Strasbourg, then in Metz, and in Saarbrücken. He is also called The painter of the knights (French: Le peintre des chevaliers) [not "The painter of knights", or Le peintre de chevaliers].

Haller's name was forgotten until 1980, when art historian Charles Sterling rediscovered it and put it on a number of paintings and illuminated manuscripts that were hitherto attributed to anonymous masters, most famously among them the Tempelhof Altarpiece (ca. 1445) from Bergheim, Haut-Rhin (not to be confused with the Tempelhof district of Berlin!), an oil on panel painting now kept in the Unterlinden Museum in Colmar. Haller is also thought to be the author of the fresco of Saint Michael defeating Satan, 800 cm (310 in) high and 420 cm (170 in) wide, of St Thomas' Church, Strasbourg.

A bridge in Strasbourg, built 2006, is named after Jost Haller.

== See also ==
- Hans Hirtz, active in Strasbourg at the same time
- Master of the Drapery Studies, probable disciple of the former
- Caspar Isenmann, Haller's colleague from Colmar
