= St Martin's Church, Colmar =

Coordinates: 48°4′38″N 7°21′30″E

- Église Saint-Martin; Collégiale Saint-Martin
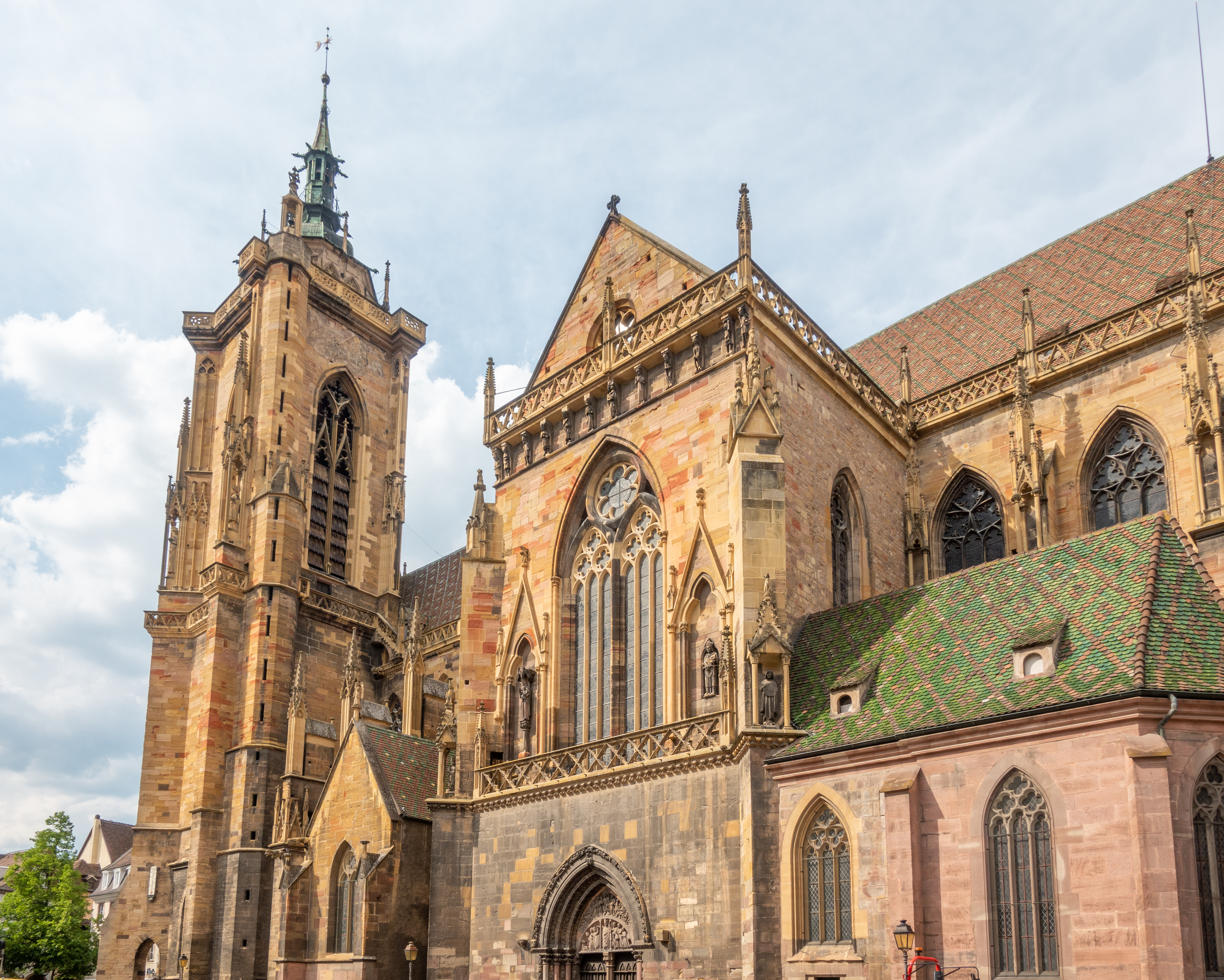
- South-West view of the church, 2022
- St Martin's Church, Colmar
- Location: Colmar
- Country: France
- Denomination: Roman Catholic Church

History
- Founded: 1234

Architecture
- Heritage designation: Monument historique
- Designated: 1840
- Style: Gothic architecture
- Completed: 1365

Specifications
- Length: 78 metres (256 ft)
- Width: 34 metres (112 ft)
- Height: 71 metres (233 ft)

Administration
- Archdiocese: Strasbourg

The Église Saint-Martin (St. Martin church) is a Roman Catholic church located in Colmar, Haut-Rhin, France. It is in the principal Gothic architectural style. Because of its past as a collegiate church, is also known als Collégiale Saint-Martin, and because of its large dimensions, as Cathédrale Saint-Martin, although Colmar had never been the seat of a bishopric.

== History and description ==
In 1972, remains were archaeologically dug out of a first church, built in Carolingian style around the year 1000. Foundations of a second church built on that spot, in Romanesque style, were found as well. The present building had been constructed between 1234 and 1365 as the church of a college devoted to the cult of Martin of Tours, and since defunct. The current, conspicuous helmet crowning the bell tower had been added in 1572 in Renaissance style after a fire.

The church is surrounded by several portals of rather small dimensions, speaking relatively to the volume of the building. Some of these portals are bricked up. The largest portals display richly sculpted tympana. The coloured tile roof, reminding that of the Collégiale Saint-Thiébaut in Thann, is another striking feature of the church's exterior. The massive pillars that support the façade, an architectural rarity, give the front of the building a somewhat cumbersome aspect that contrasts with the airy look of the high apse windows. Another noteworthy detail of the building's exterior, testament to the troubled History of Jews in Alsace, is the presence of two "Judensäue", one in the shape of a gargoyle, the other as a corner sculpture of a portal.

In the spacious interior, whose furniture had suffered bitter losses during the French Revolution, the most remarkable features are the exuberant Baroque organ case of 1755, (the mechanism and the pipes themselves, originally built by Johann Andreas Silbermann, were completely replaced in 1979), as well as the ambulatory, a unique feature in Alsatian churches. The many chapels that surround the choir display several medieval altars and statues. Of the remaining Gothic stained glass windows in the nave, the most noteworthy is a 13th century head of a beardless Christ, another rare feature.

Martin Schongauer's monumental Madonna of the Rose Bower was painted for the church in 1473 and stood there until 1972, when it was stolen. After its recovery in 1973, it was moved to the neighbouring former Dominican Church, another Gothic, but architecturally very different sanctuary.

=== The Isenmann altarpiece ===
In 1462, the municipal painter Caspar Isenmann received a commission to paint a set of panels dedicated to the Life of Jesus Christ. He delivered the paintings (oil on fir wood) in 1465. In 1720, the altar was dismantled and Isenmann's paintings were dispersed. Seven surviving panels are kept since 1853 in the Unterlinden Museum.

== Dimensions ==
Some figures relating to the building's size:

- Total interior length: 78 meters
- Maximal interior height: 20 metres (66 ft)
- Interior width of the transept: 34 meters
- Height of the steeple: 71 meters

== Gallery ==
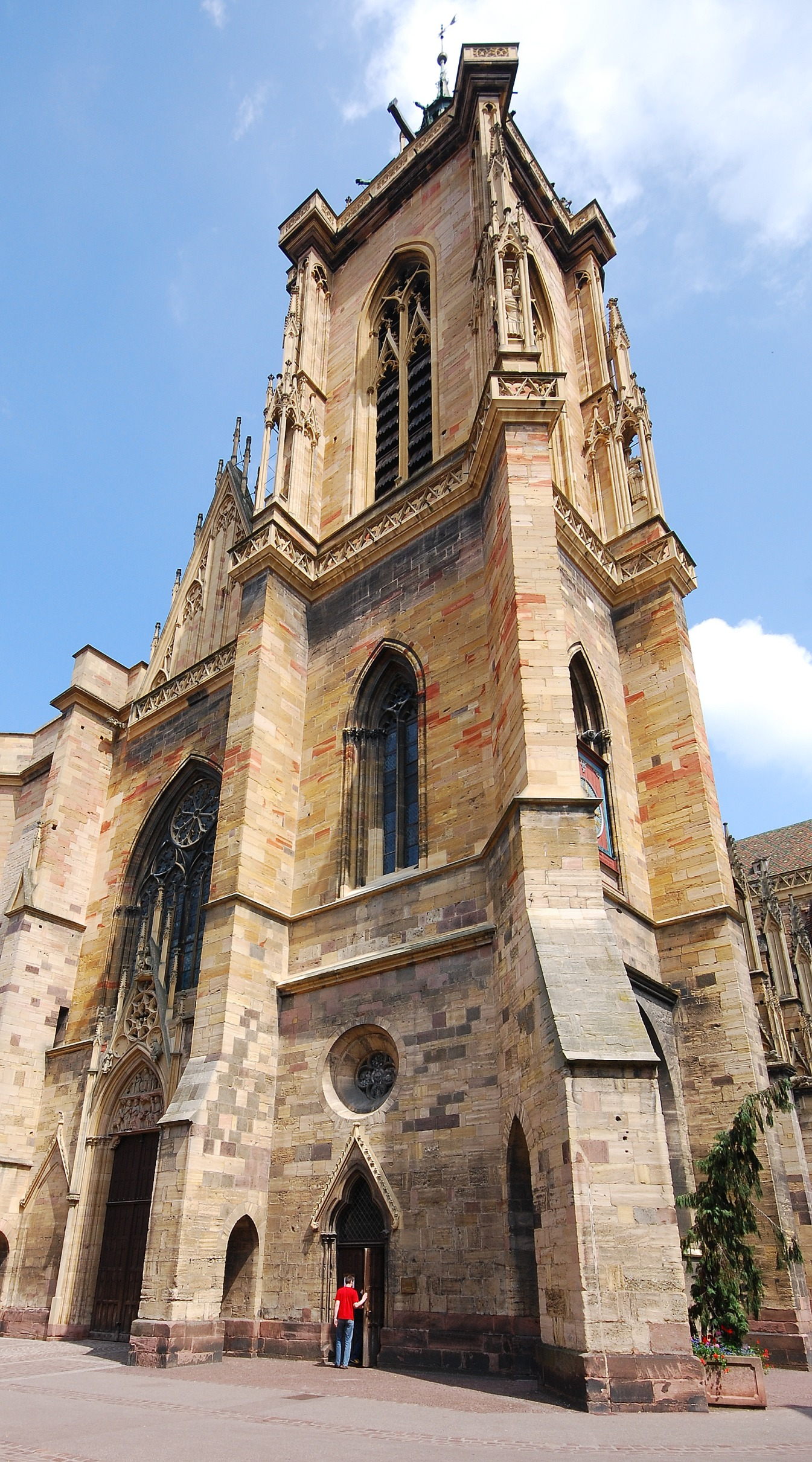
Façade and steeple. Note the unusual, massive supporting pillars

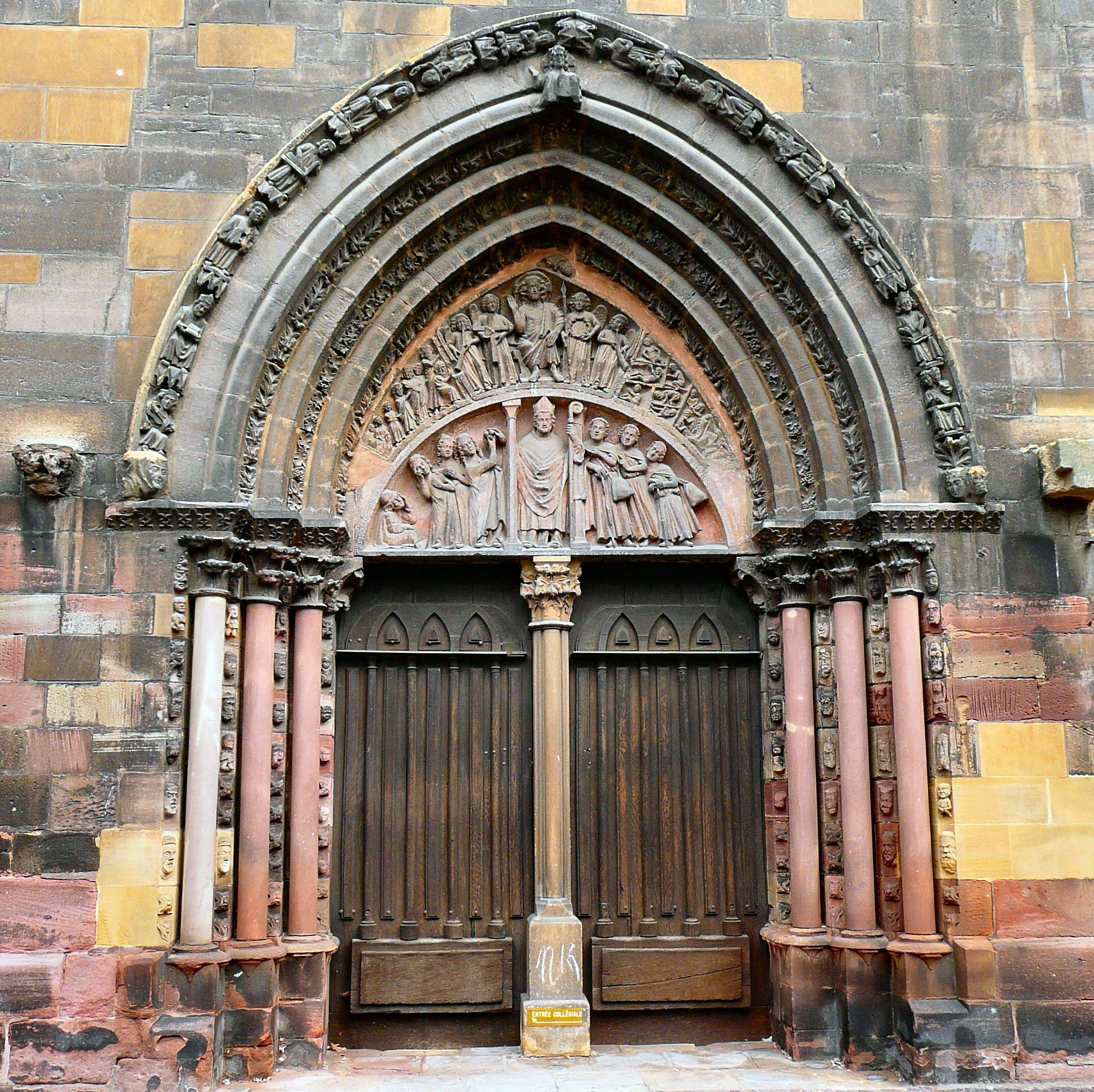
A side portal. The tympanum is signed by a "Master Humbret".

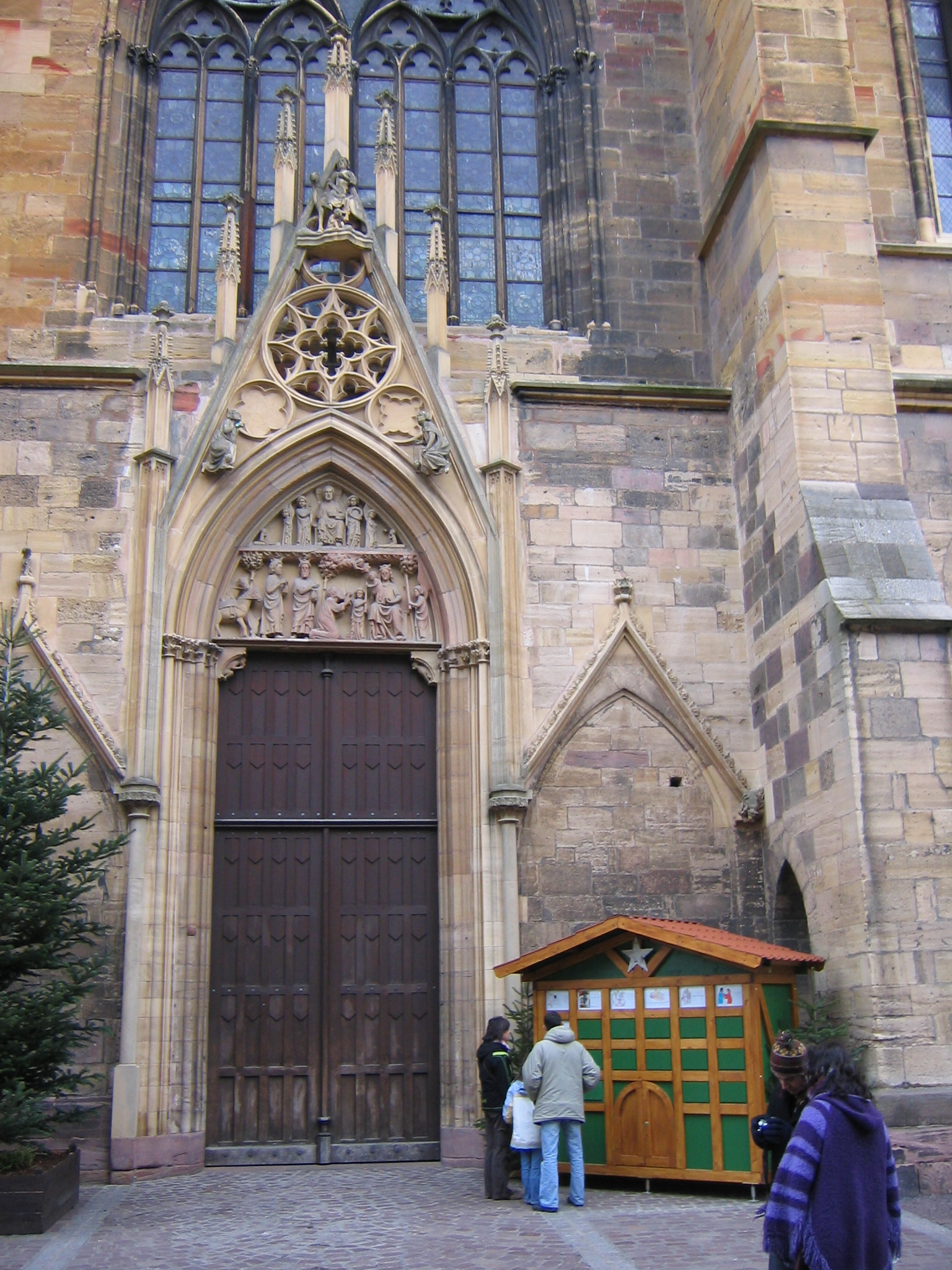
Façade portal

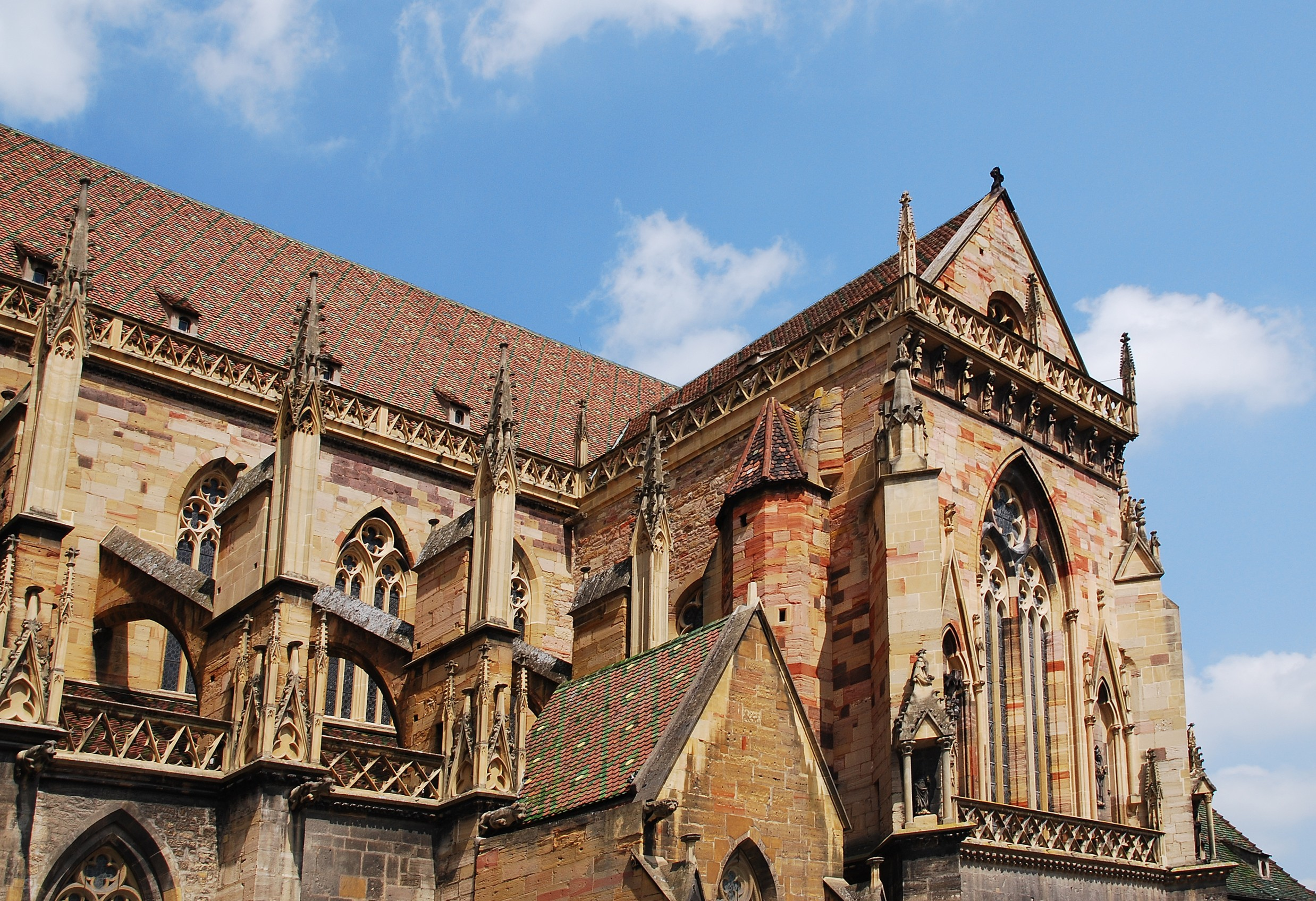
View of transept

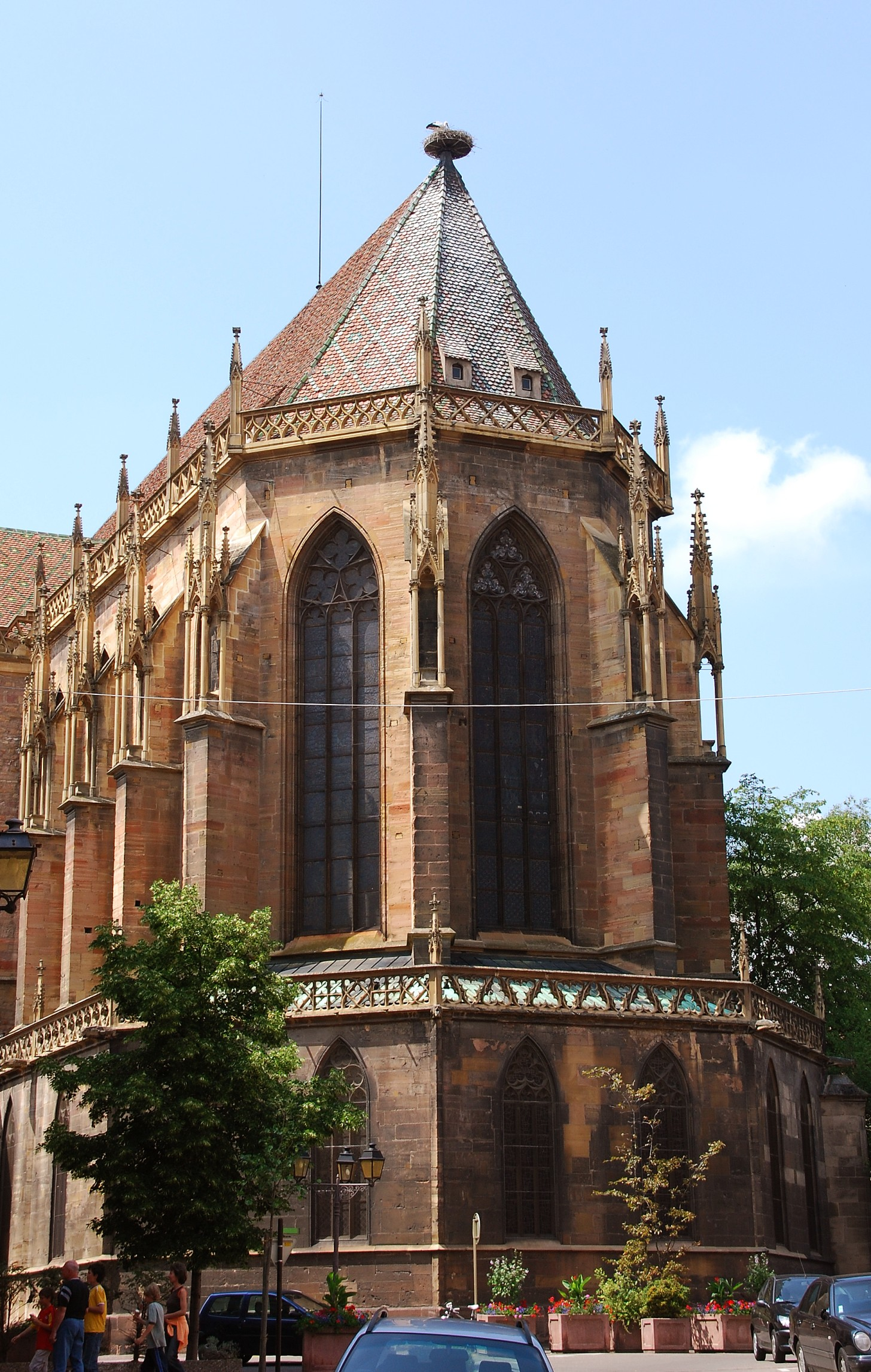
Rear of the church, with stork nest

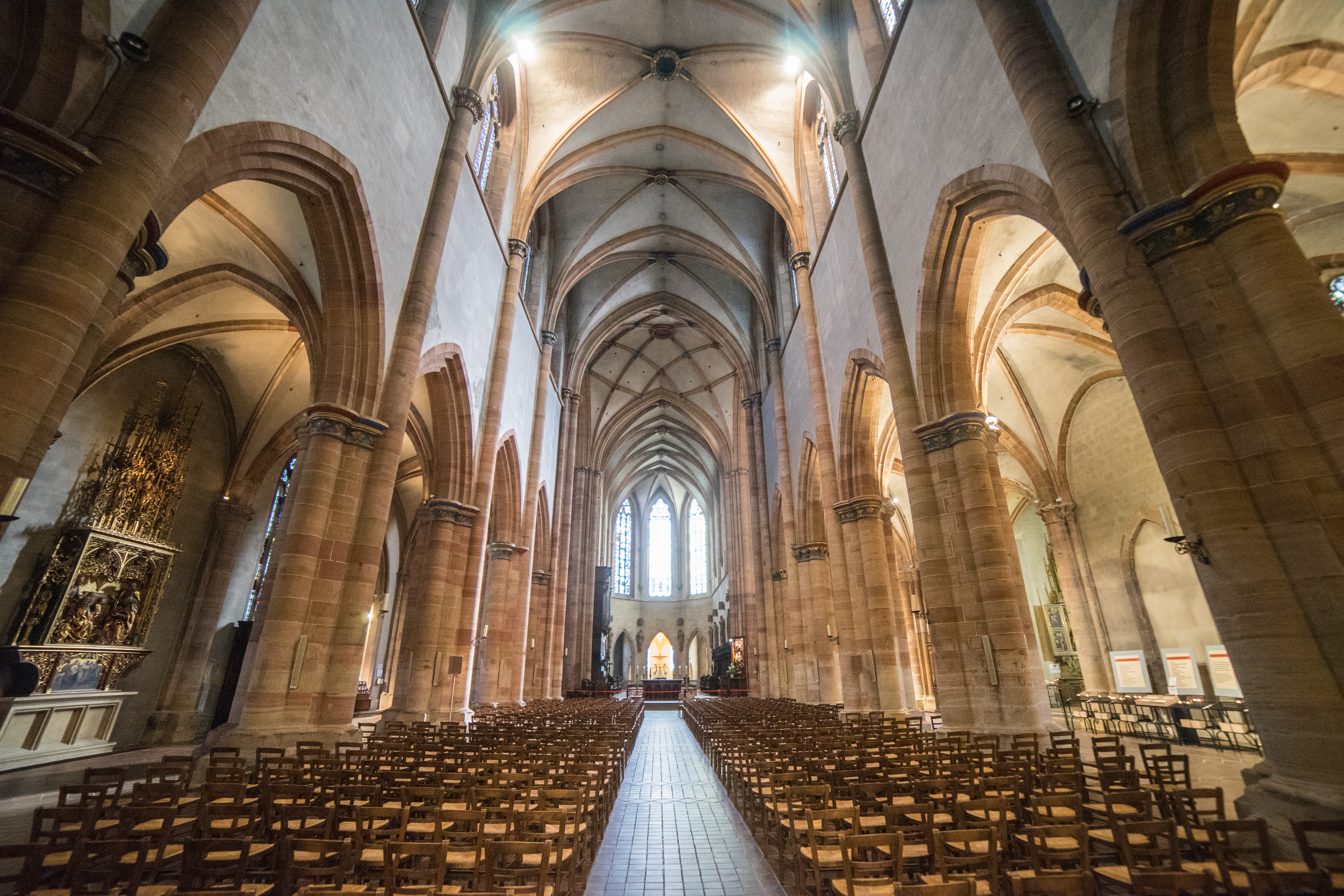
Inside the church

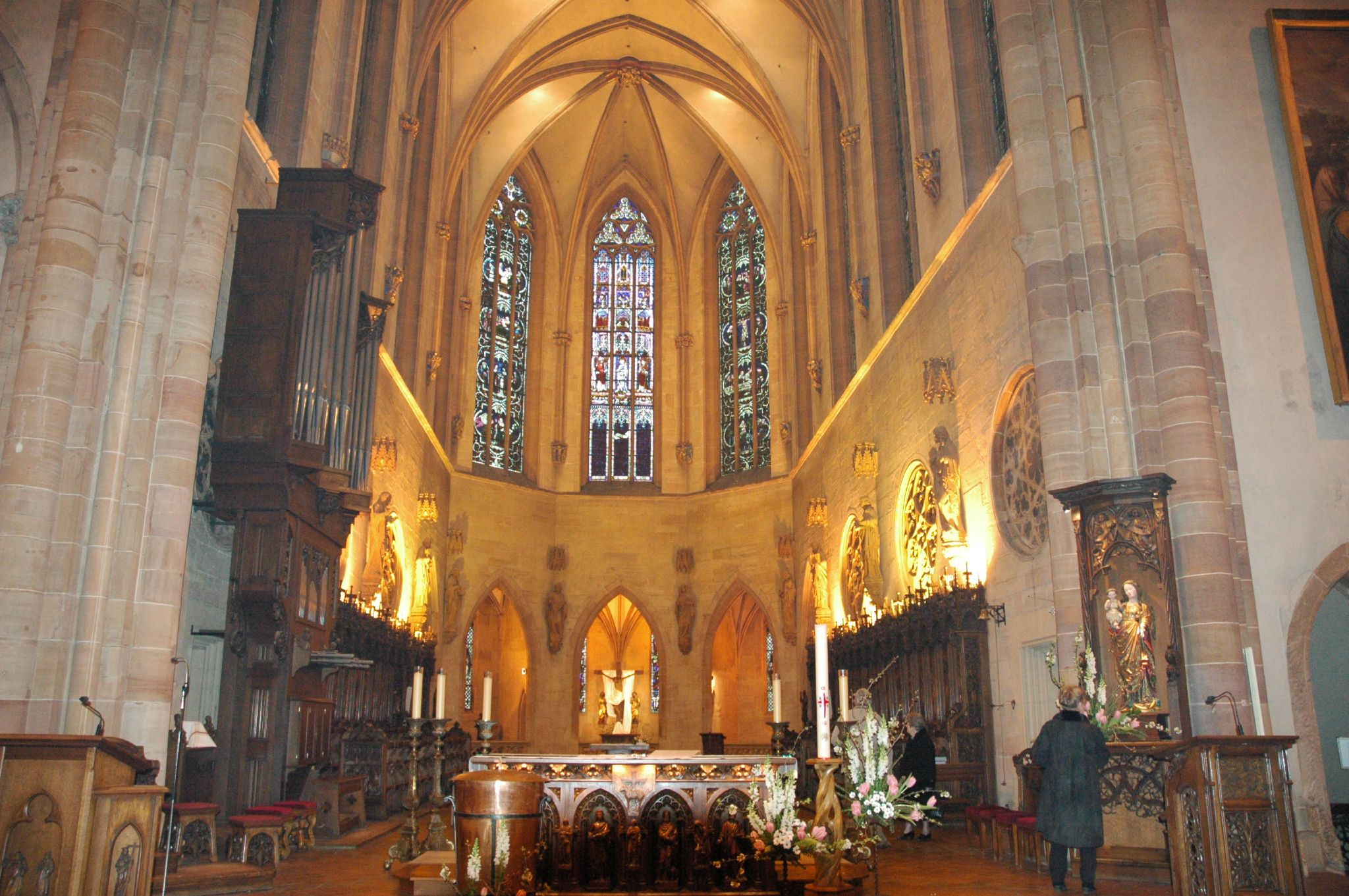
The choir

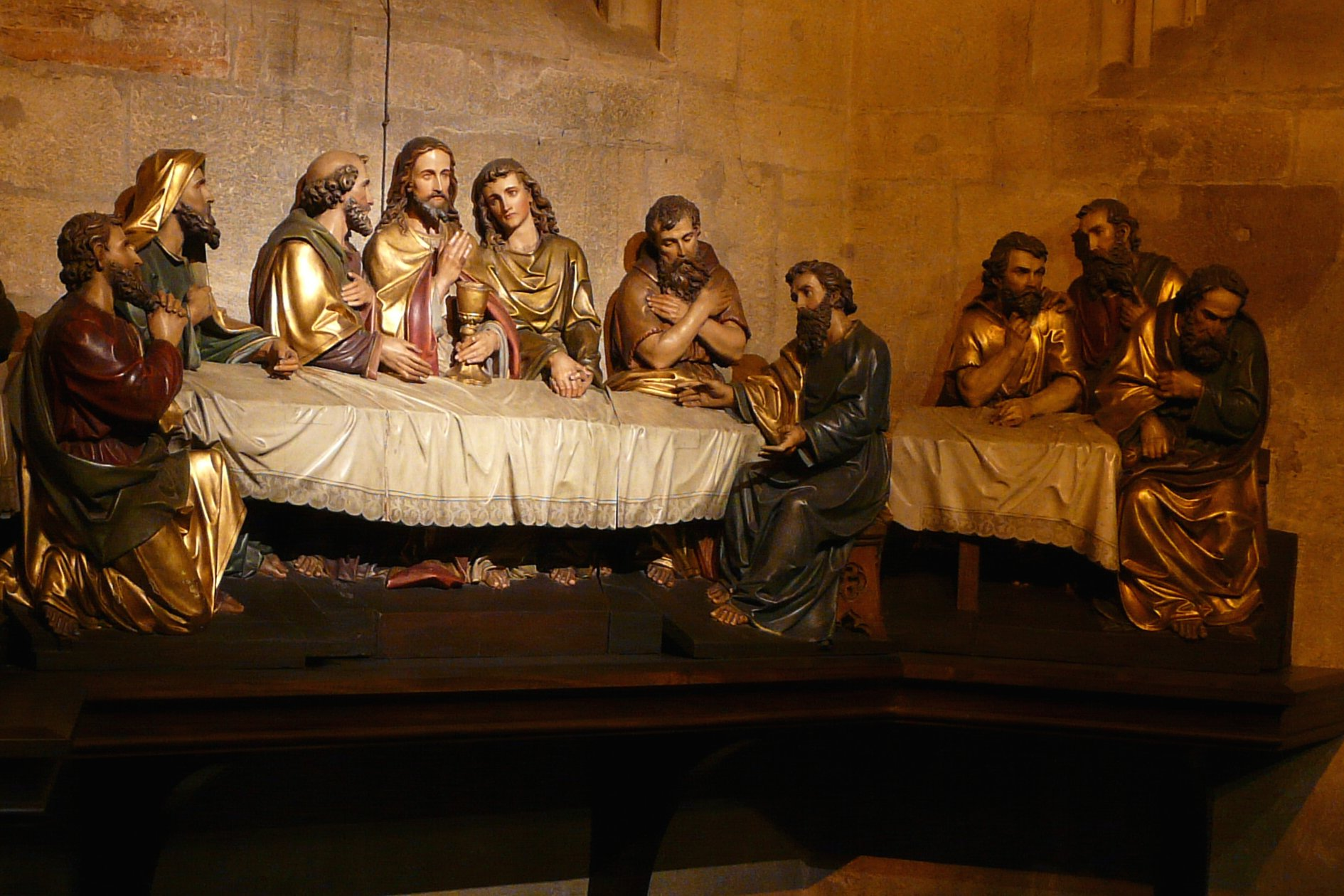
Late Gothic life-sized "Last Supper" inside the church

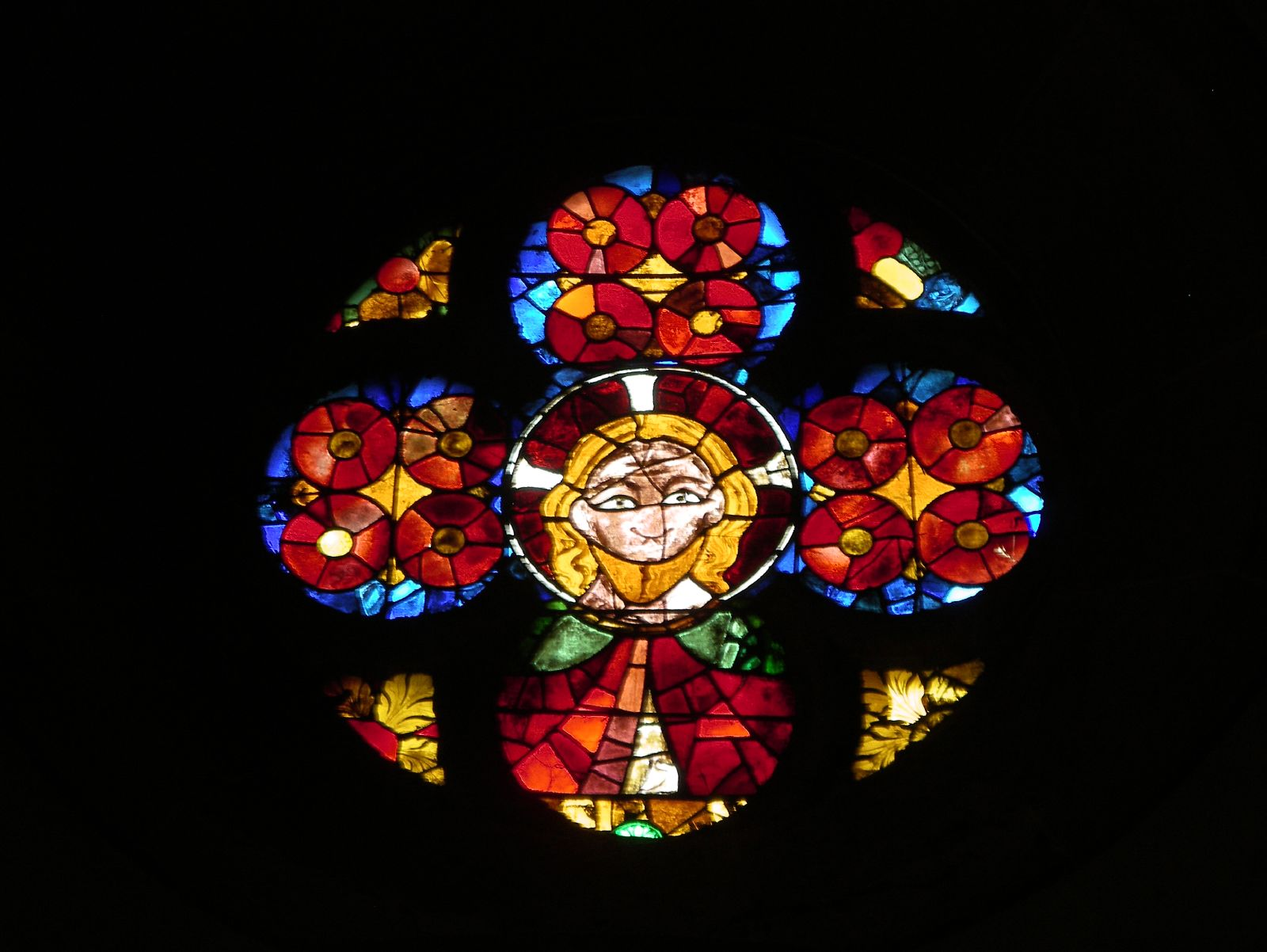
Stained glass face of Christ

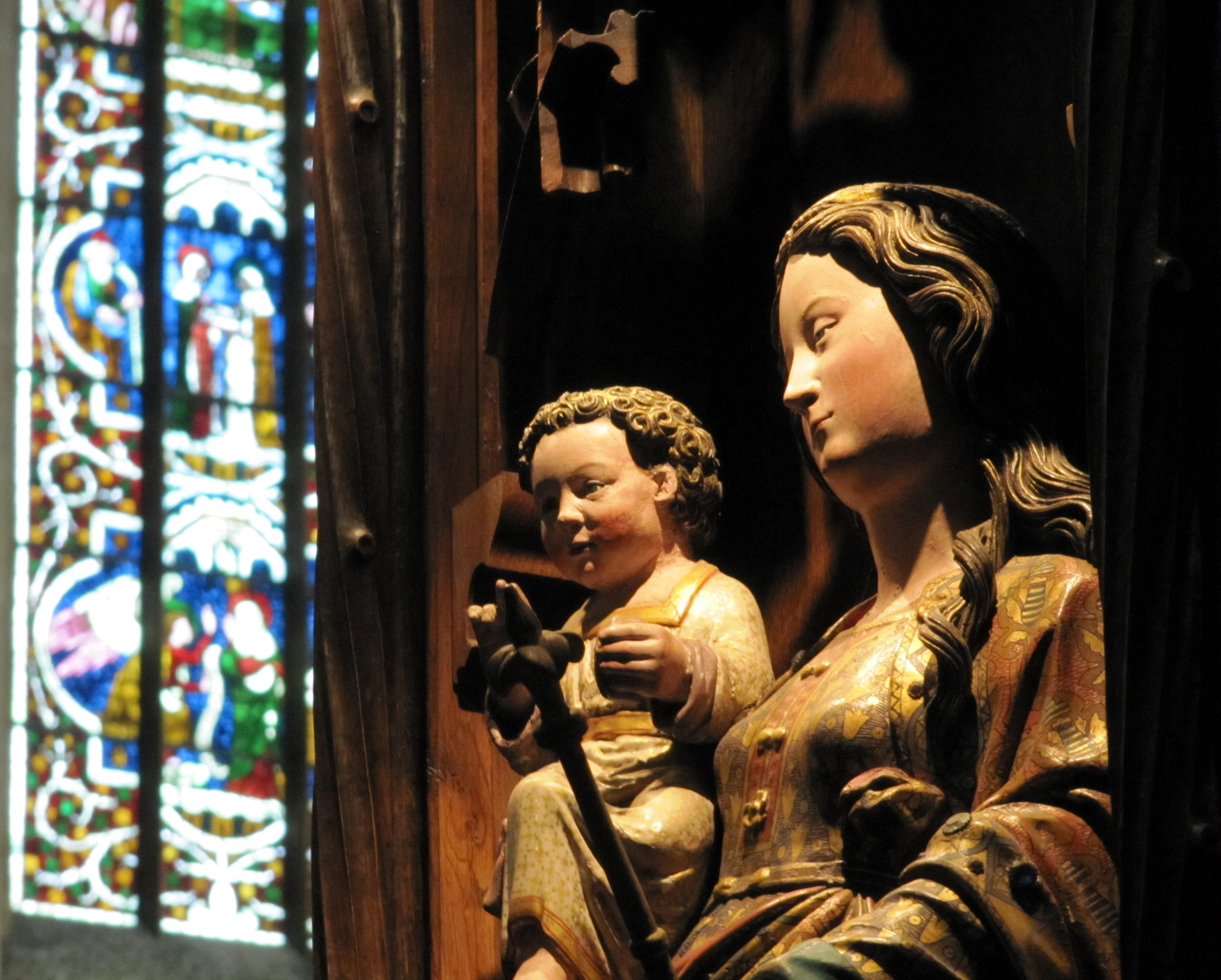
Statue of Virgin and Child

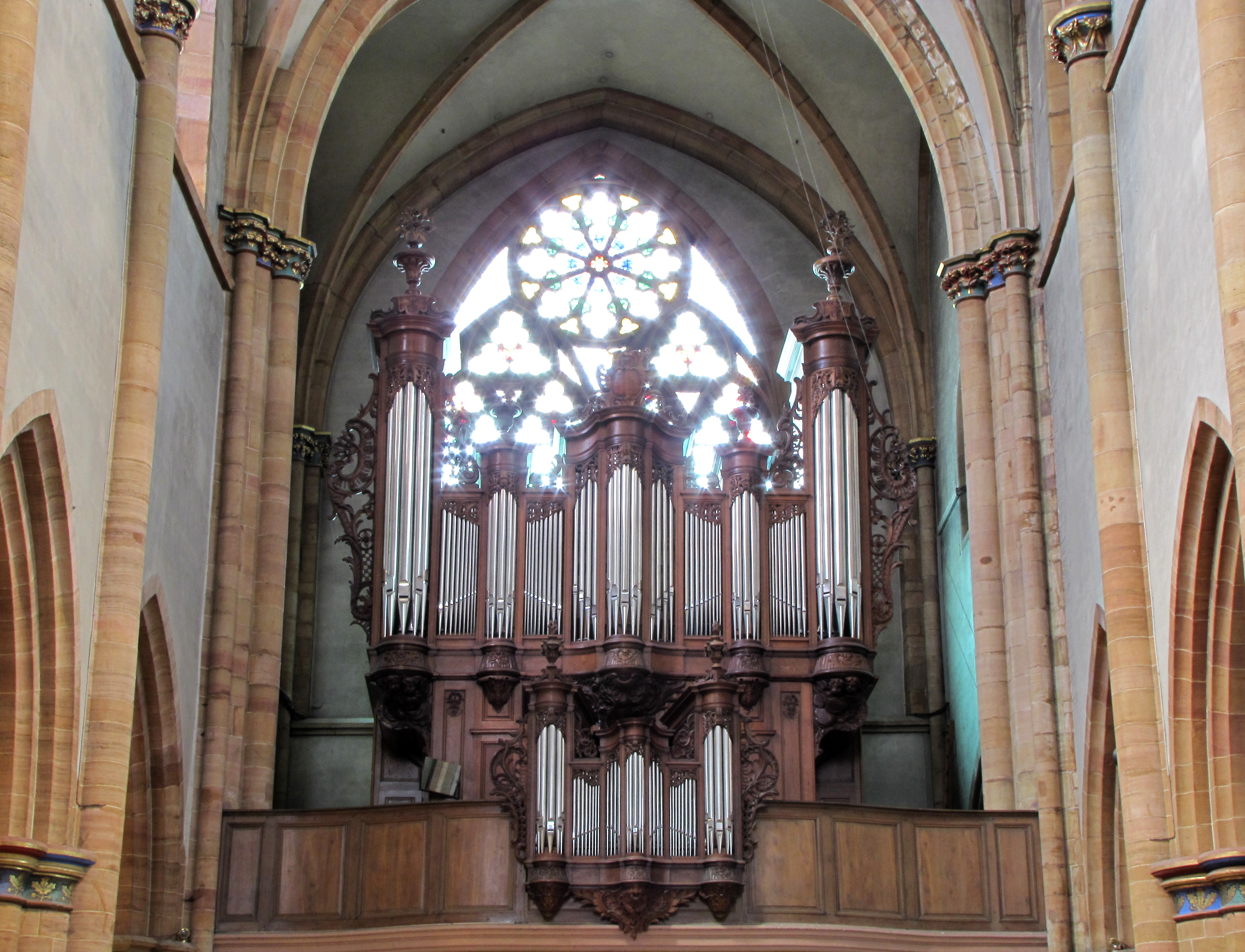
Organ

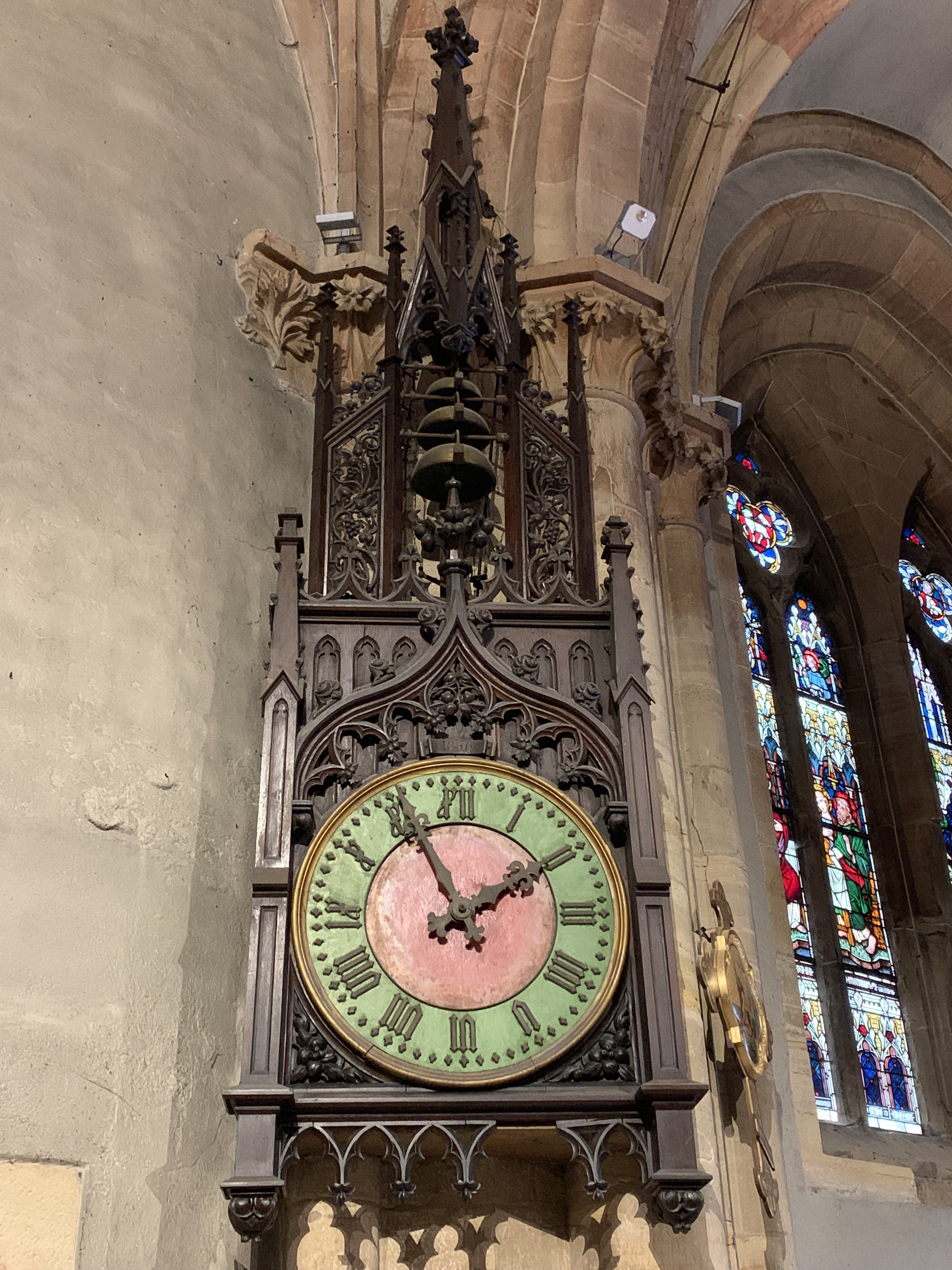
Clock inside the church

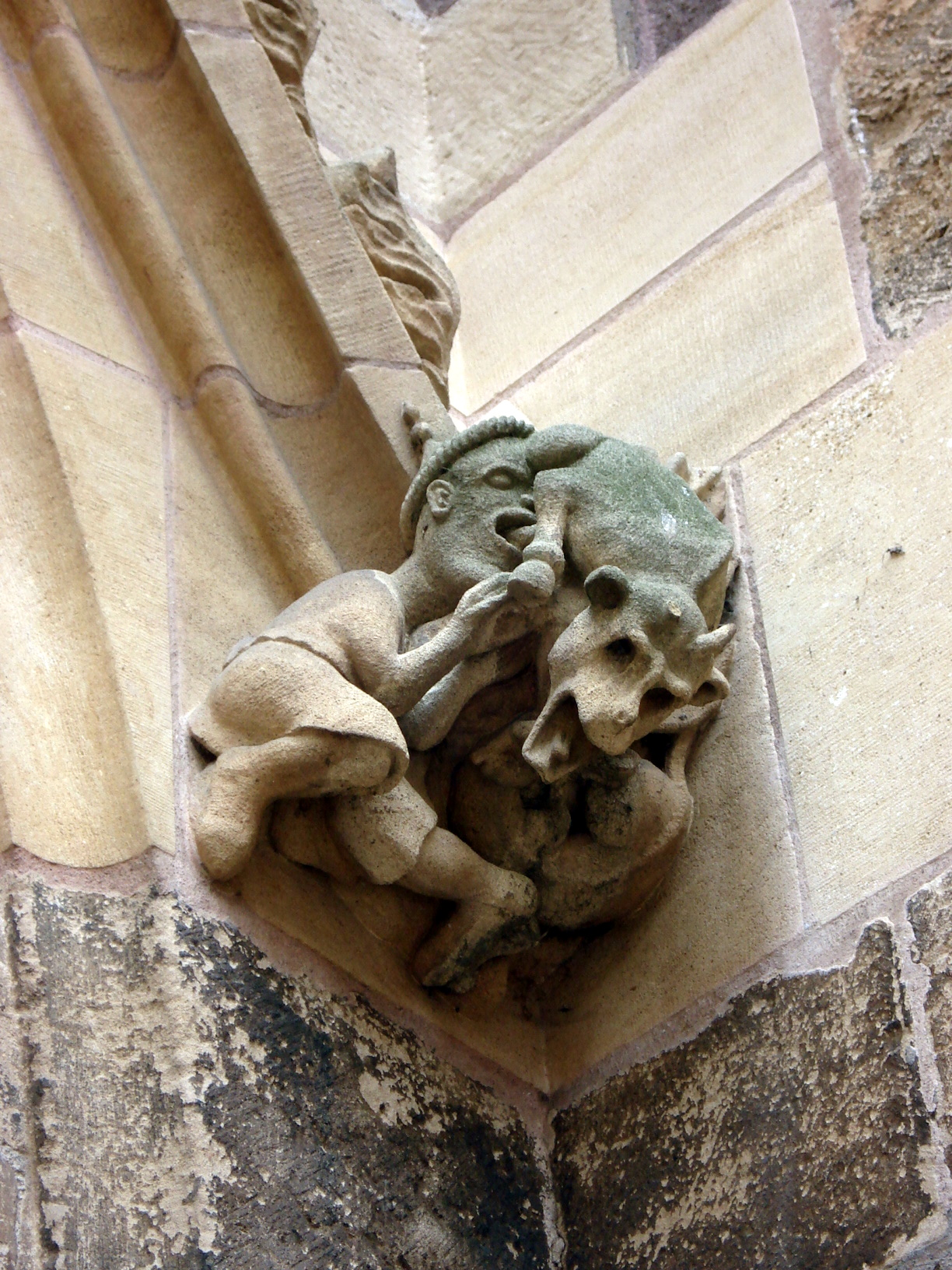
One of Colmar's "Judensäue"
