= Tempelhof Altarpiece =

Painting by Jost Haller

- French: Retable du Tempelhof de Bergheim
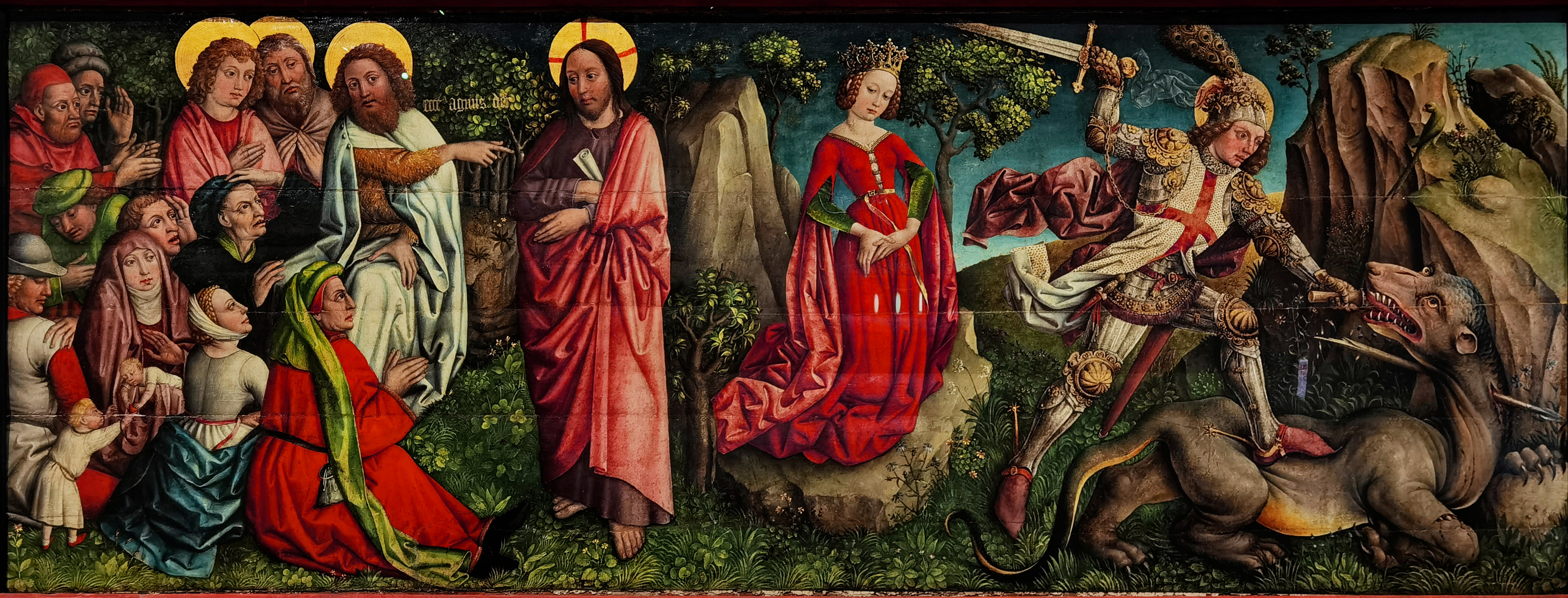
- Artist: Jost Haller
- Year: circa 1445
- Medium: oil paint on fir wood
- Movement: International Gothic; Christian art
- Subject: John the Baptist; Saint George and the Dragon
- Dimensions: 89.4 cm × 212 cm (35.2 in × 83 in)
- Location: Unterlinden Museum, Colmar
- Accession: 1852

The Tempelhof Altarpiece is an oil on panel painting from circa 1445, by the German artist Jost Haller, today in the collection of the Unterlinden Museum in Colmar, Alsace (inventory number 88.RP.142). It had originally belonged to the commandery of the Order of Saint John, also called the Tempelhof, of Bergheim near Colmar, where it was used as a church altarpiece. After it was confiscated in 1793, at the height of the French Revolution, it became "state owned" (bien national), before eventually becoming an item of the museum's collection.

The left half of the painting depicts John the Baptist (the patron saint of the Order of Saint John) preaching to a crowd while pointing at Jesus, who stands close to the middle. The right half shows Saint George, a Saint George's Cross prominently displayed on his chest, slaying the dragon under the eyes of the princess. Standing close to the middle as well, but back-to-back with Jesus, she's dressed in flamboyant red with a little green on the sleeves, while Jesus is dressed in purple and a less fiery red.
