= Ludwig Schongauer =

German painter and engraver

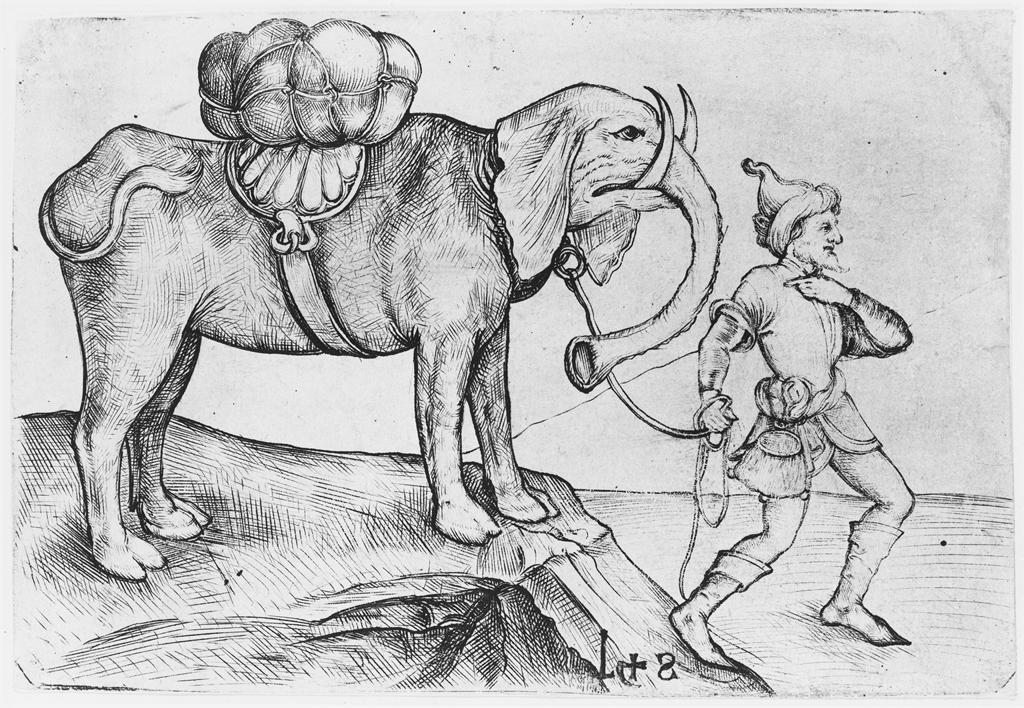
Elephant by Ludwig Schongauer, Vienna Museum

Ludwig Schongauer (c. 1440–1494) was a German painter and engraver.

Schongauer was born in Augsburg into an Alsatian family of artists, later settling in Colmar. His father Caspard was a goldsmith, and he had three brothers. Two of his brothers Georg and Paul became goldsmiths themselves, while his third brother was the painter Martin Schongauer. Both Martin and Ludwig are thought to have been pupils of the painter Caspar Isenmann.

== Selected Known Works ==
- Wing of an altarpiece: The Arrest of Christ
- Christ before Pilate; The Resurrection
