= Master of the Karlsruhe Passion =

German painter

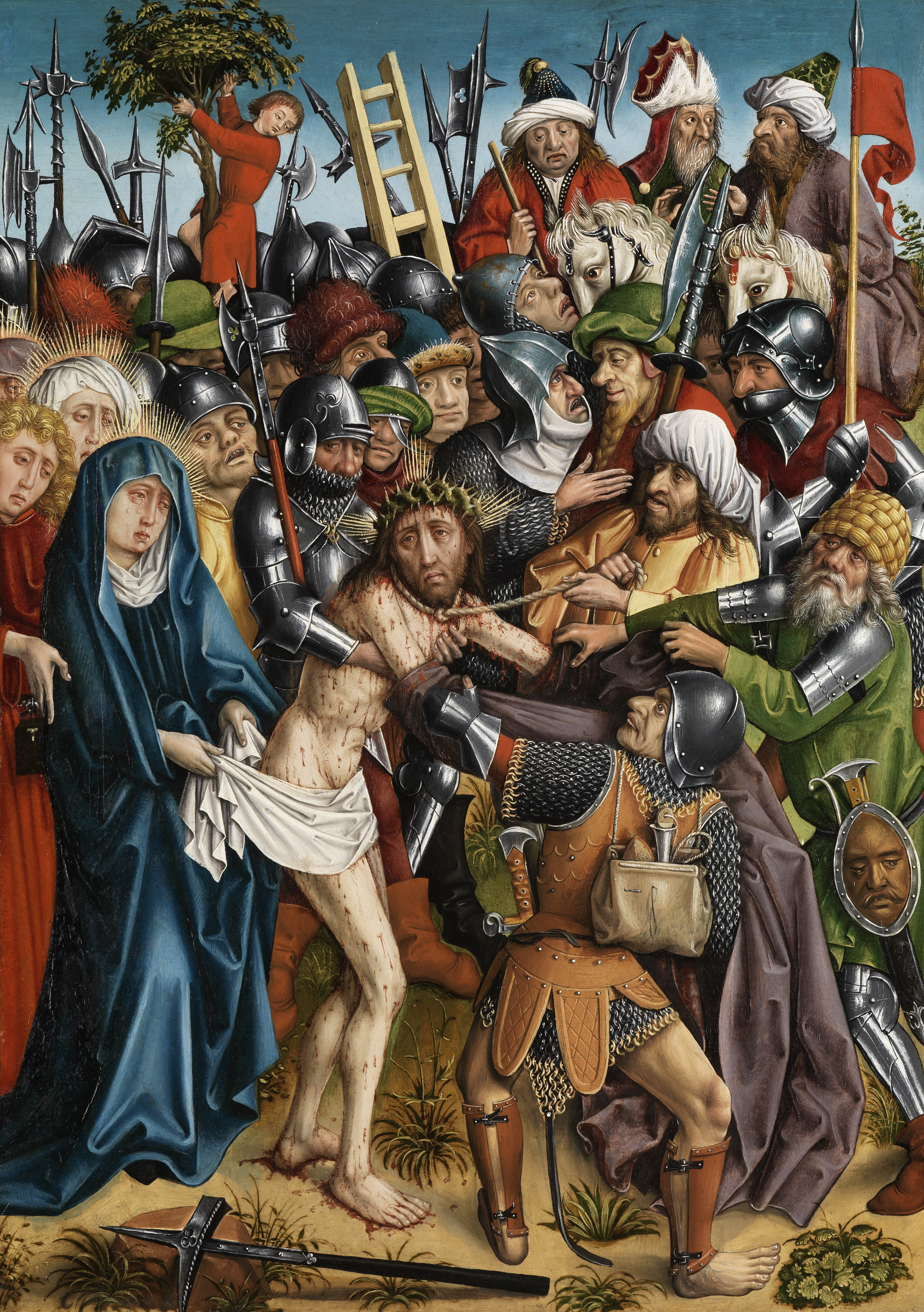
The Disrobing of Christ, from the Karlsruhe Passion, c. 1450-–55

The Master of the Karlsruhe Passion is the notname of a German painter of the late Gothic period active in the Upper Rhine. Very influential on other painters in the region, he may be identified with the Strasbourg painter Hans Hirtz. He is named after his main work, the Karlsruhe Passion, though he may also have been the artist behind the murals in the former Dominican church in Strasbourg, only known through two 17th-century copies (a coloured drawing and an etching).

== The Karlsruhe Passion ==
The Karlsruhe Passion is an altarpiece on panel showing the Passion of Christ painted for the Saint Thomas Church in Strasbourg around 1450 and split up during the Reformation. From 1858 the panels were gradually reunited in Karlsruhe, with six panels now in the Staatliche Kunsthalle Karlsruhe. However, one panel of the Arrest of Jesus remains in the Wallraf–Richartz Museum in Cologne. Each panel is 46 cm wide and 67 cm high but their original layout is now unknown.

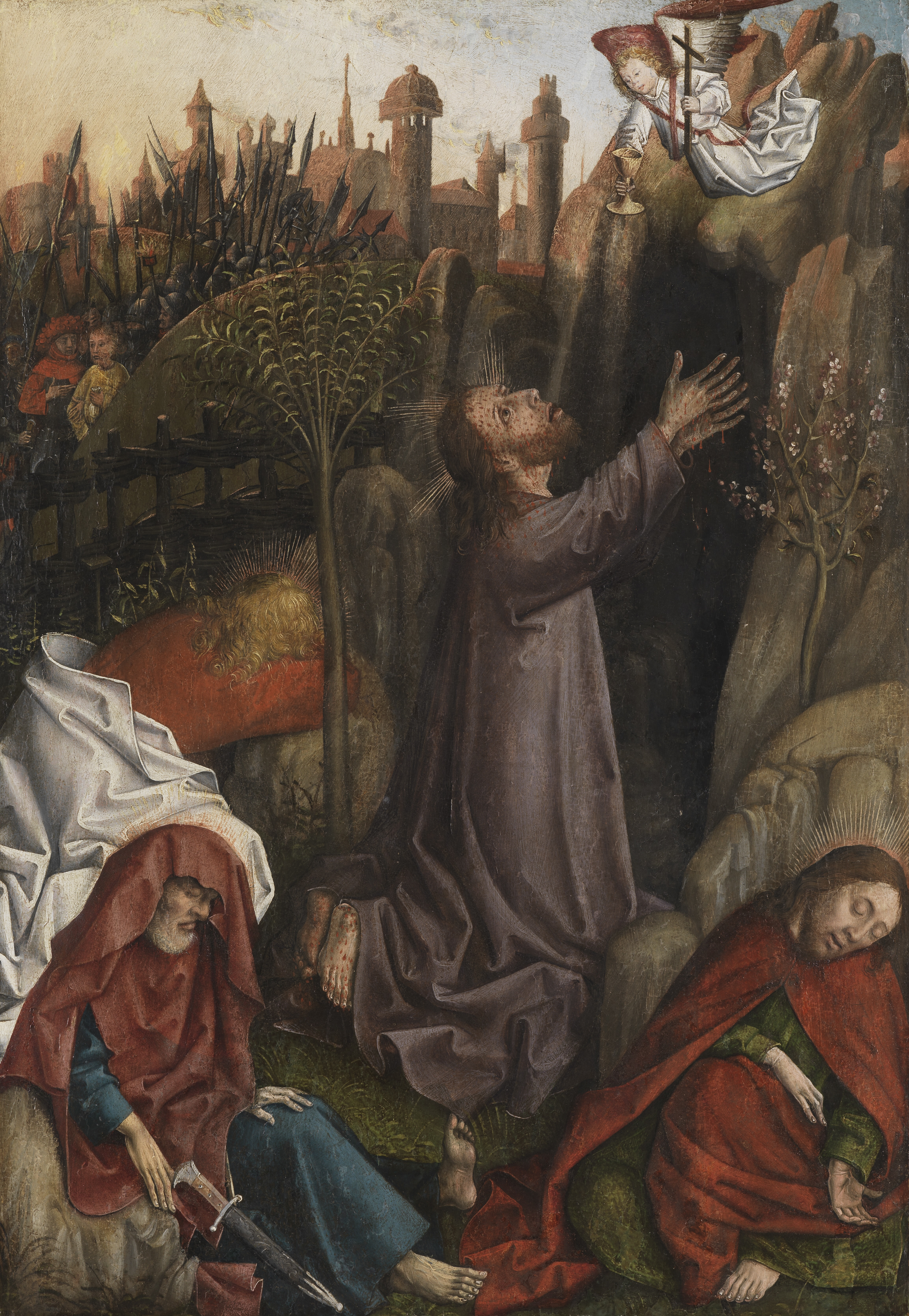
Prayer on the Mount of Olives (Karlsruhe)

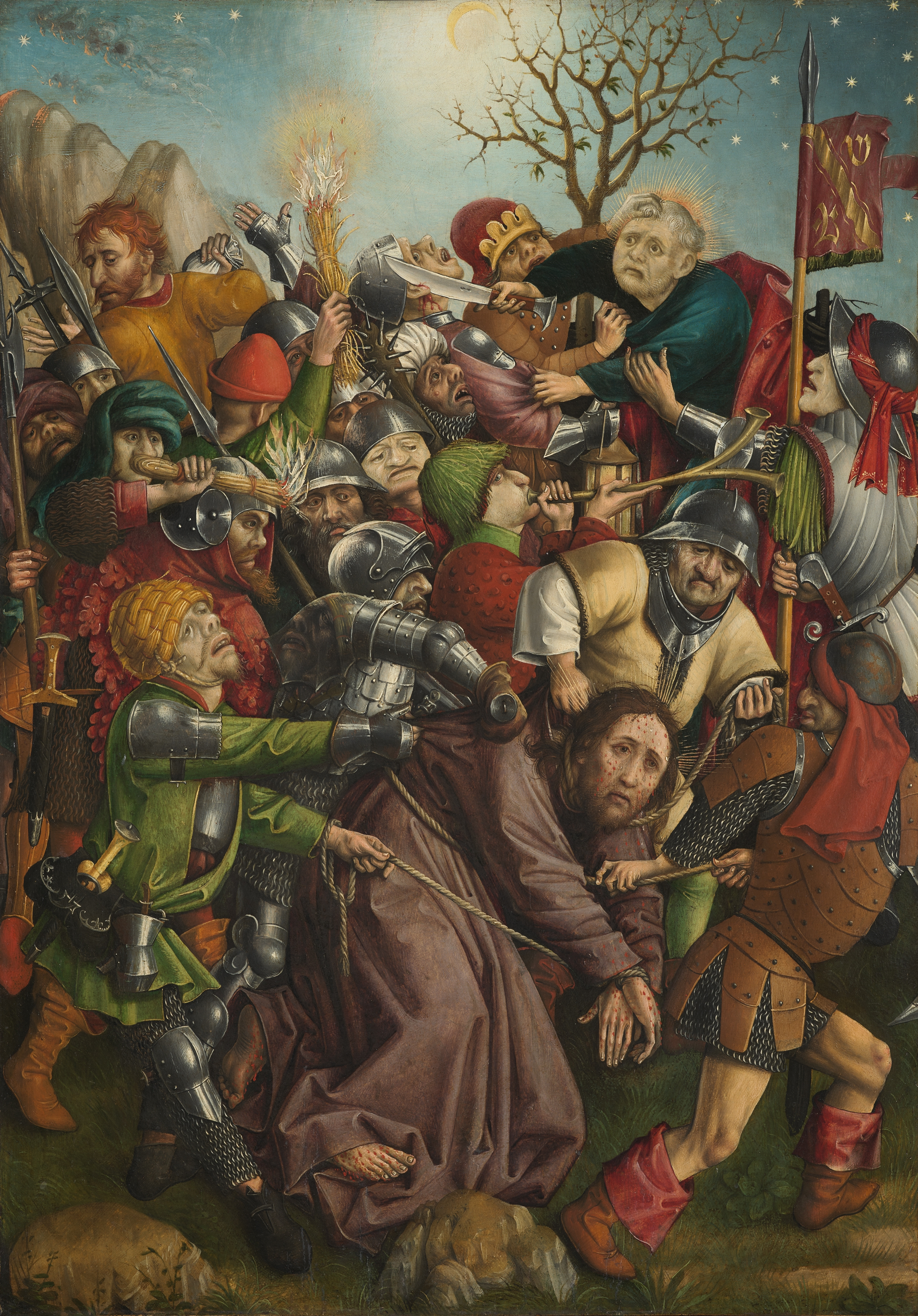
Arrest (Cologne)

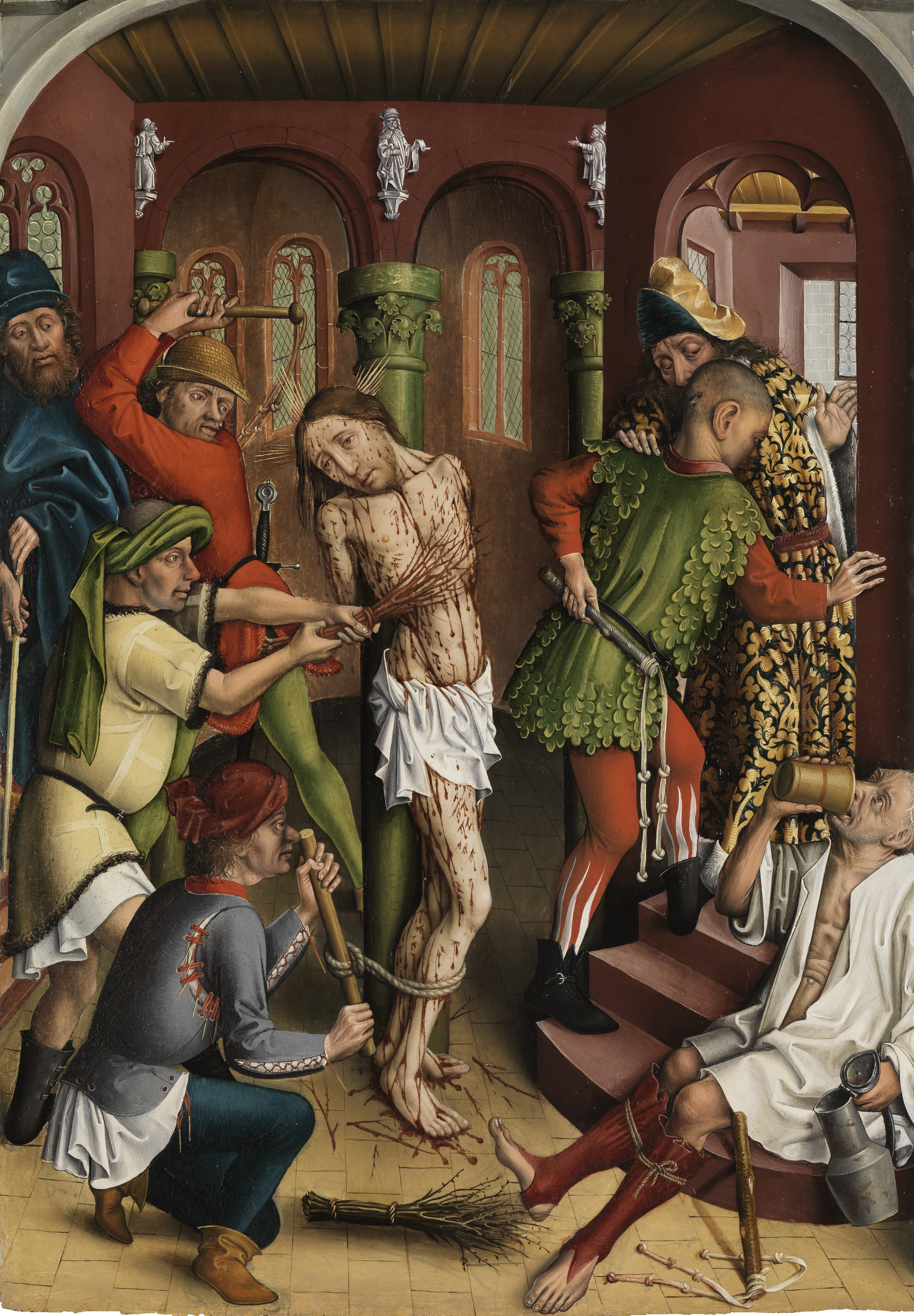
Flagellation (Karlsruhe)

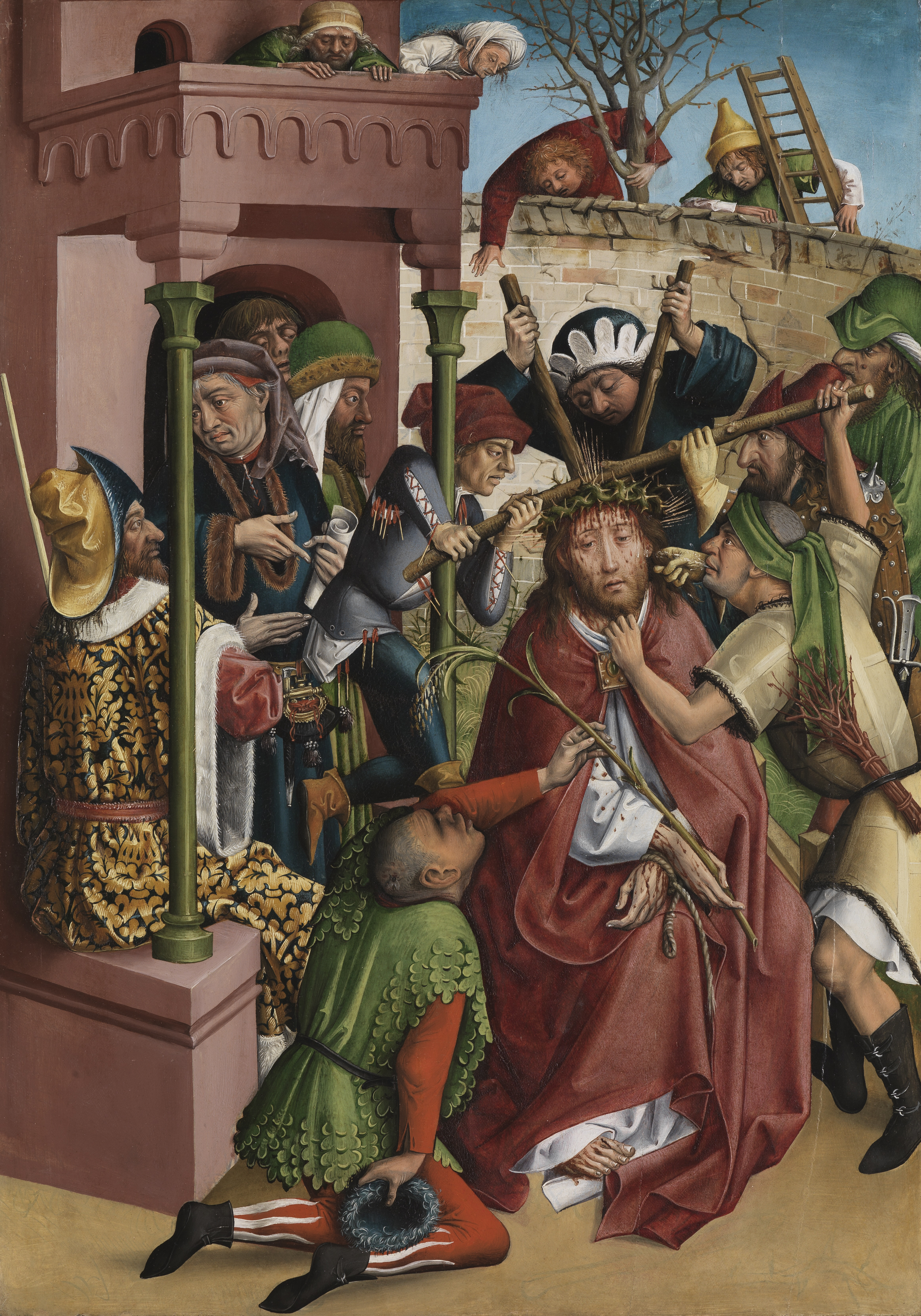
Crowning with Thorns (Karlsruhe)

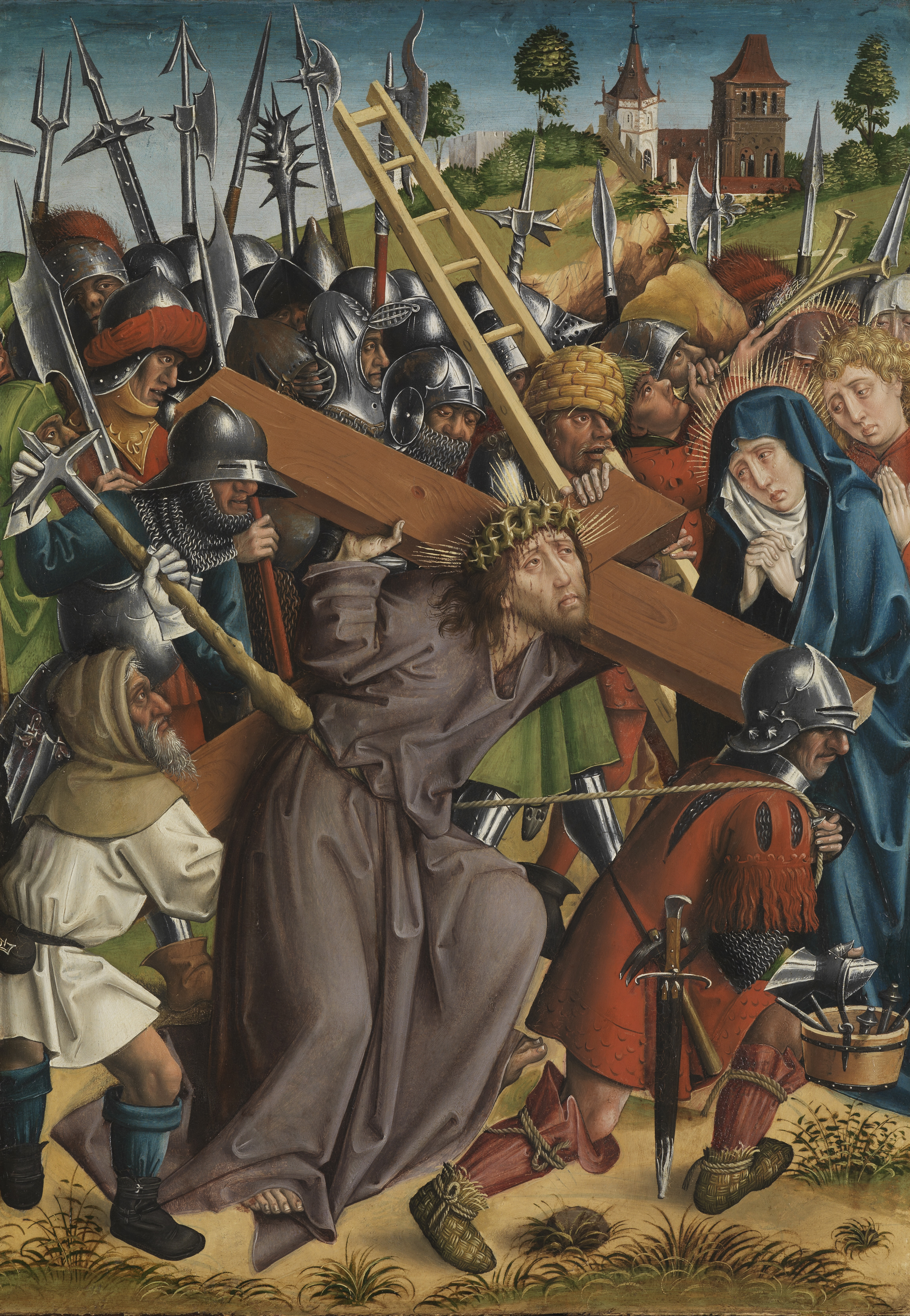
Carrying the Cross (Karlsruhe)

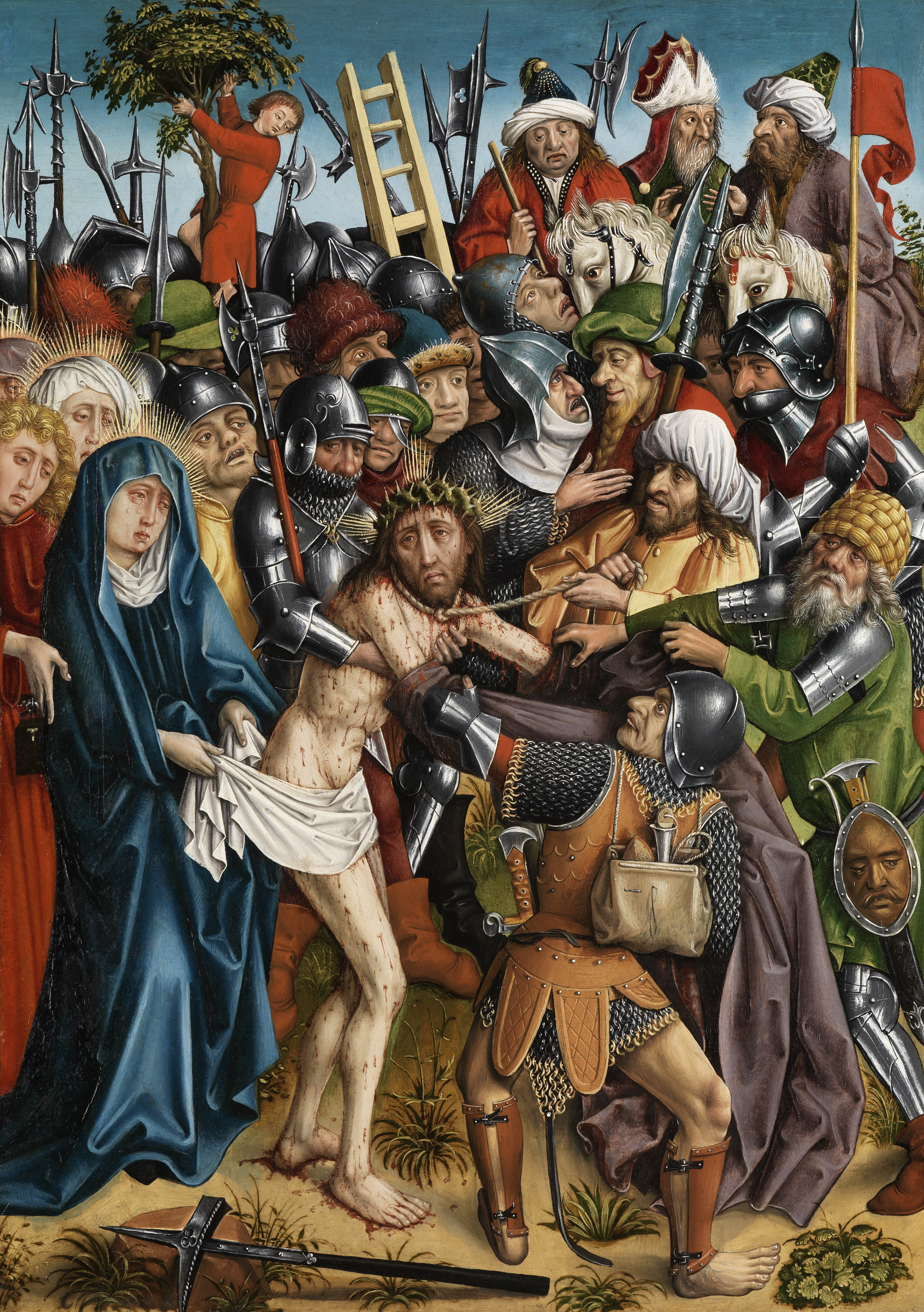
Disrobing (Karlsruhe)

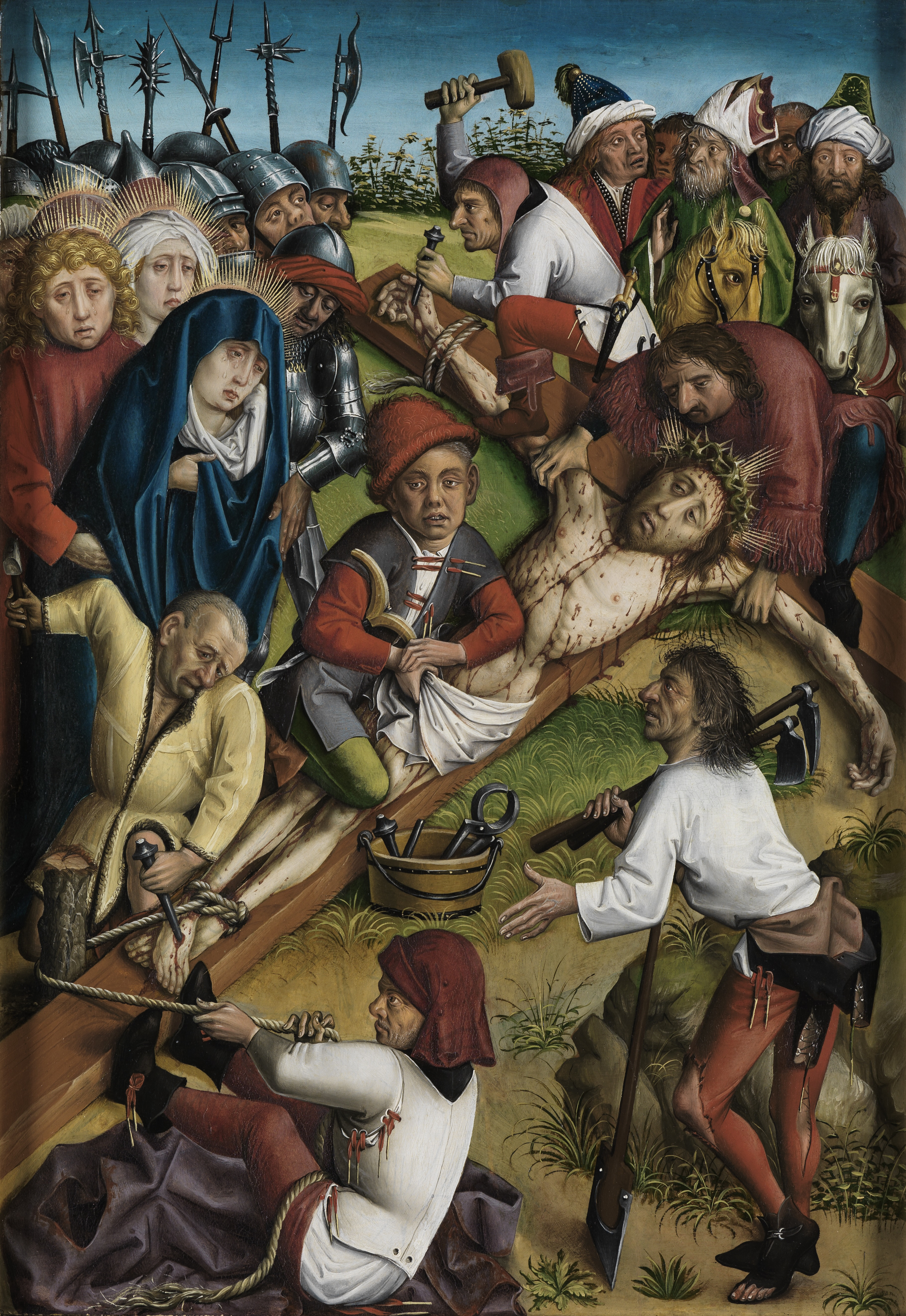
Nailing to the Cross (Karlsruhe)

The panels show their artist's special narrative, visual and symbolic language and include lower-class characters. Their interpretation of the Passion recalls the aims of the contemporary Devotio Moderna, which recommended independent scriptural study and a personal relationship with God.

The panels' narrative qualities are also new in Upper Rhenish art and influenced the development of painting in the region. A similarity in the rendering of the draperies links the Master of the Karlsruhe Passion to the Master of the Drapery Studies - the former may have taught the latter. The impact of the Master of the Karlsruhe Passion can be seen in Upper Rhenish art between around 1485 and 1500, particularly in artists active in Strasbourg.

== Bibliography ==
- (in German) L. Fischel: Die Karlsruher Passion und ihr Meister. Karlsruhe 1952
- (in German) F. Blasius: Bildprogramm und Realität. Untersuchungen zur oberrheinischen Malerei um die Mitte des 15. Jahrhunderts am Beispiel der Karlsruher Passion. Frankfurt 1986 (Dissertation)
- (in German) D. Lüdke, Staatliche Kunsthalle Karlsruhe (Hrsg.): Die Karlsruher Passion: ein Hauptwerk Straßburger Malerei der Spätgotik, (Katalog zur Ausstellung Die Karlsruher Passion, Staatliche Kunsthalle Karlsruhe 1996). Ostfildern 1996
- (in German) W. Franzen: Die Karlsruher Passion und das „Erzählen in Bildern“. Studien zur süddeutschen Tafelmalerei des 15. Jahrhunderts. Berlin 2002 (Dissertation)
