= Master of the Drapery Studies =

German painter

Master of the Drapery Studies, Master of the Coburg Roundels
- Meister der Gewandstudien, Meister der Coburger Rundblätter
- Born: (Possibly) Heinrich Lützelmann; Not after 1450
- Died: Around 1500
- Known for: Paintings and drawings
- Notable work: The Passion of Christ (Strasbourg)
- Style: Gothic

The Master of the Drapery Studies (German: Meister der Gewandstudien), also known as Master of the Coburg Roundels (German: Meister der Coburger Rundblätter) is the notname given to the "very productive" and "multifaceted" late 15th-century author of some 30 surviving paintings and over 150 surviving drawings. According to the J. Paul Getty Museum, up to 180 surviving drawings "have been attributed to this master, comprising one of the most extensive bodies of drawn work of any northern European artist before Albrecht Dürer." Conversely, it has been suggested at least once that both the Master of the Drapery Studies and the Master of the Coburg Roundels may be two separate persons and that their body of work is attributable to a whole circle of artists.

== Presumed identity and body of work ==
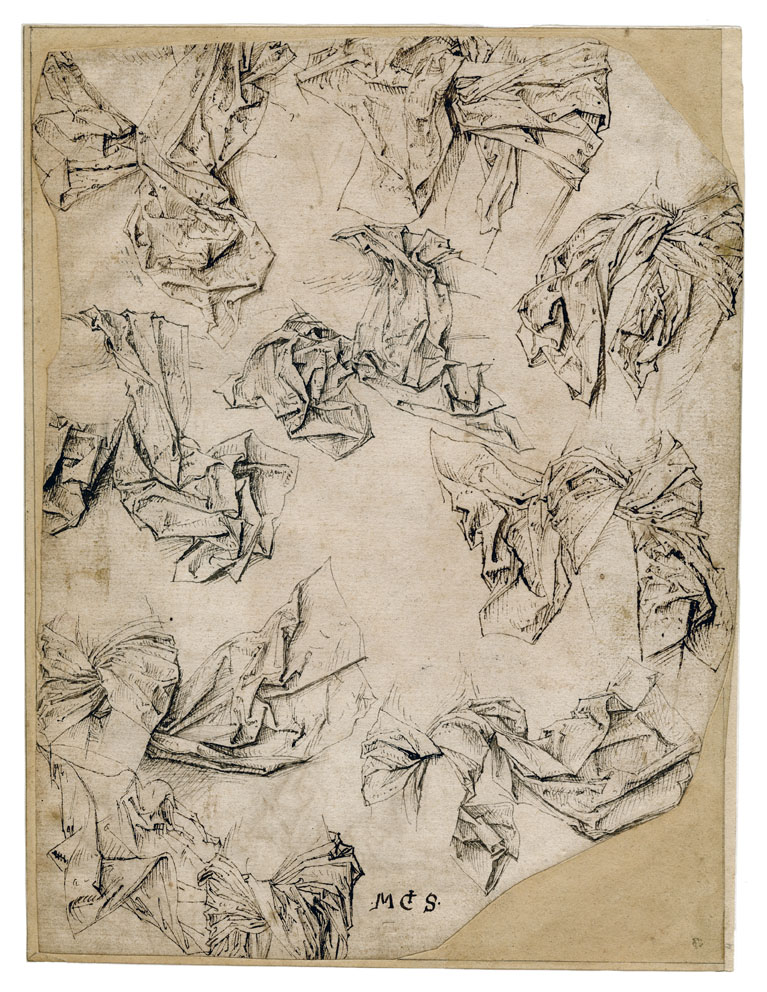
A drapery study (Cabinet des estampes et des dessins, Strasbourg)

Before they were given to the Master, many of his drawings had been attributed by art historians to the likes of Dürer, Martin Schongauer or even the artist known as Matthias Grünewald, with whom he was at one point, wrongly, identified.

The Master of the Drapery Studies was first called the Master of the Coburg Roundels, after two circular drawings from about 1485 kept in the print room of the Coburg Castle in Bavaria. Those works are stylistically related to many drawings and sketches representing "folds of clothing such as sleeves, loincloths, or even whole garments", from which the Master quickly drew his second notname. The name "Master of the Coburg Roundels" was first given by Ernst Buchner (1892–1962) in 1927, the name "Master of the Drapery Studies" was first given by Friedrich Winkler (1888–1965) in 1930.

By general consensus (including the proponents of the theory of the "circle of artists"), the Master of the Drapery Studies/of the Coburg Roundels was active in Strasbourg, Alsace, in the years 1475–1500, or 1470–1497, or 1470–1500. According to scholars such as the German Wilfried Franzen, the Master may be identical with Heinrich Lützelmann, the author of the ten panels of The Passion of Christ, a commission of the St. Magdalene Church in Strasbourg. Lützelmann may have been a student/disciple of Hans Hirtz, an influential painter recorded in Strasbourg from 1421 to 1463 and generally thought to be identical with the "Master of the Karlsruhe Passion". According to Franzen, the Master of the Drapery Studies is also the author of a second Passion cycle (eight panels) now kept in the Landesmuseum in Mainz.

The Musée de l’Œuvre Notre-Dame keeps at least two further paintings attributed to the Master (known in French as Maître des études de draperies or Maître des ronds de Cobourg). The Musée des Beaux-Arts of Dijon owns four panels, the J. Paul Getty Museum owns one, the National Museum in Kraków owns another one, as do the Musée des Beaux-Arts of Lyon, and the Staatliche Kunsthalle in Karlsruhe (a triptych).

A large part of the drawings of the Master of the Drapery Studies are related to stained glass windows from the workshop of the Strasbourg-based master Peter Hemmel of Andlau, although it is disputed if they were made as copies after or as preparatory sketches before the fabrication of the windows. Hemmel, incidentally, also designed windows for the same St Magdalene Church (in 1480–1481) for which the Master painted The Passion of Christ (between 1485 and 1490), his largest surviving single work. Several of the drawings of the Master are kept in famous museums such as the Louvre, the British Museum, the Metropolitan Museum of Art, the Albertina, the National Gallery of Art, and the Unterlinden Museum.

== Gallery ==
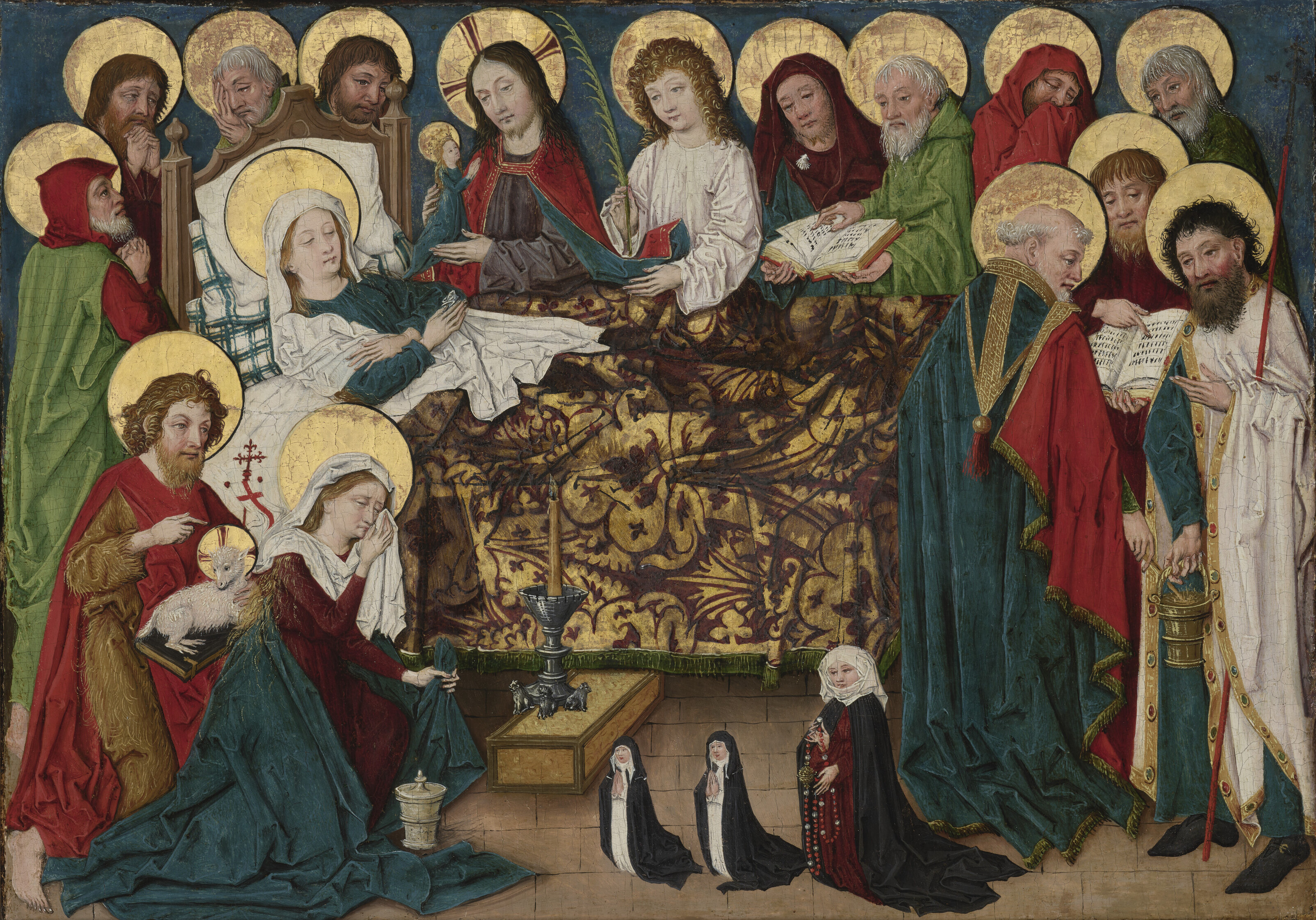
Dormition of the Mother of God, 1480-90, National Museum in Kraków

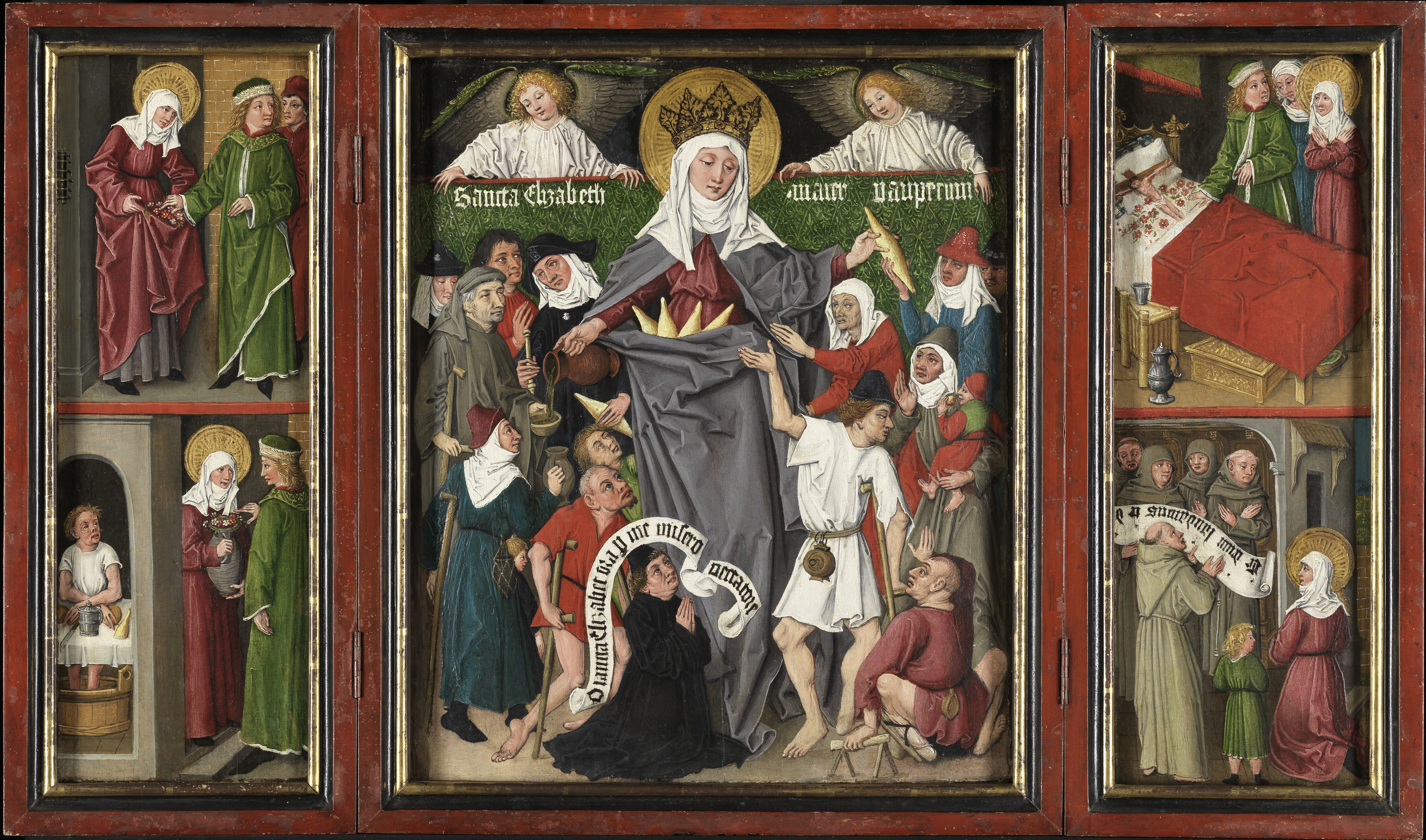
Elizabeth Triptych, c.1480-90, Staatliche Kunsthalle Karlsruhe
