= Hans Hirtz =

German painter

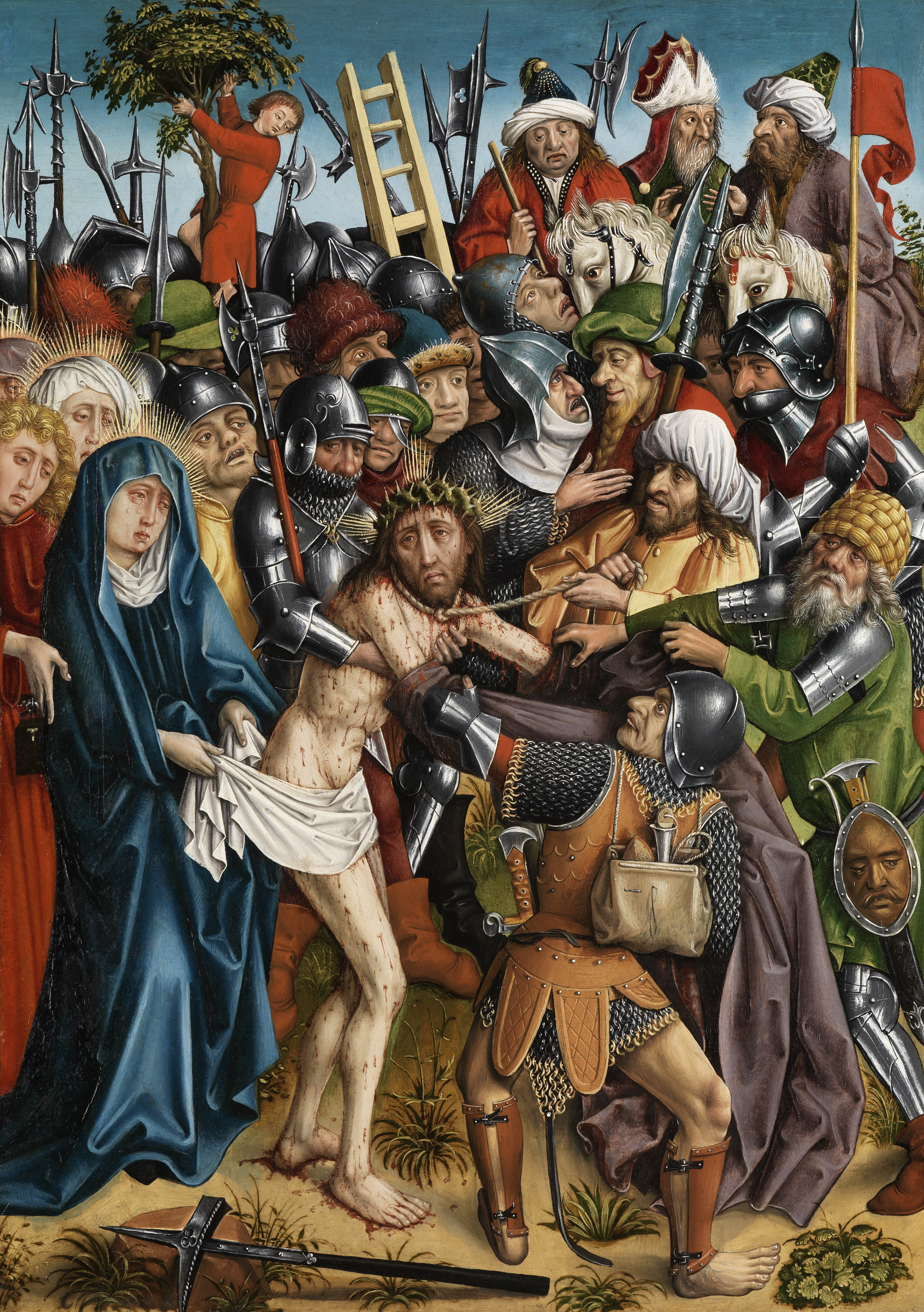
Master of the Karlsruhe Passion (Hans Hirtz?), The Disrobing of Christ from the Karlsruhe Passion, c.1440.

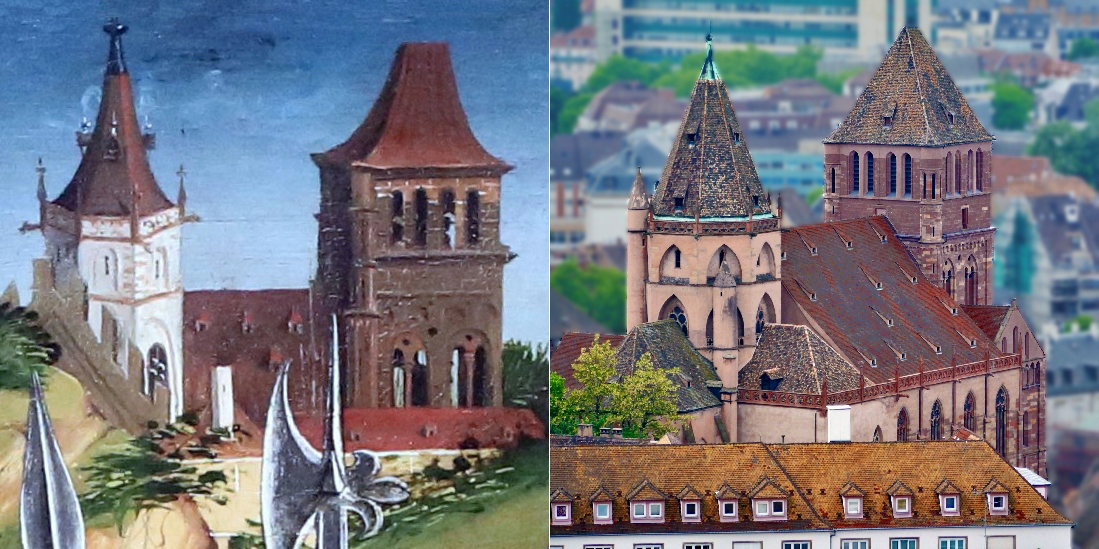
A detail from the Carrying of the Cross from the Karlsruhe Passion and the same church seen in 2015

Hans Hirtz or Hirtze was a German painter of the late Gothic period, recognized as a major painter by art historians as early as the 16th century. He was active between 1421 and 1463 in Strasbourg and other areas of the Upper Rhine. His years of birth and death are unknown, though a reference to his widow in a document of 1466 shows he died before that date - the document shows that she remarried to the Strasbourg stained-glass artist Peter Hemmel.

== Master of the Karlsruhe Passion? ==
He may be identifiable with the painter known as the Master of the Karlsruhe Passion, the notname of an outstanding artist of the Late Gothic Upper Rhenish school. Dated to around 1450, six panels from the Karlsruhe Passion are now in the Staatliche Kunsthalle Karlsruhe and one of the deposition of Christ is now in the Wallraf-Richartz-Museum in Cologne.

== See also ==
- Jost Haller, active in Strasbourg at the same time
- Master of the Drapery Studies, probably a disciple of Hirtz
