= Stavelot Triptych =

Medieval reliquary and portable altar

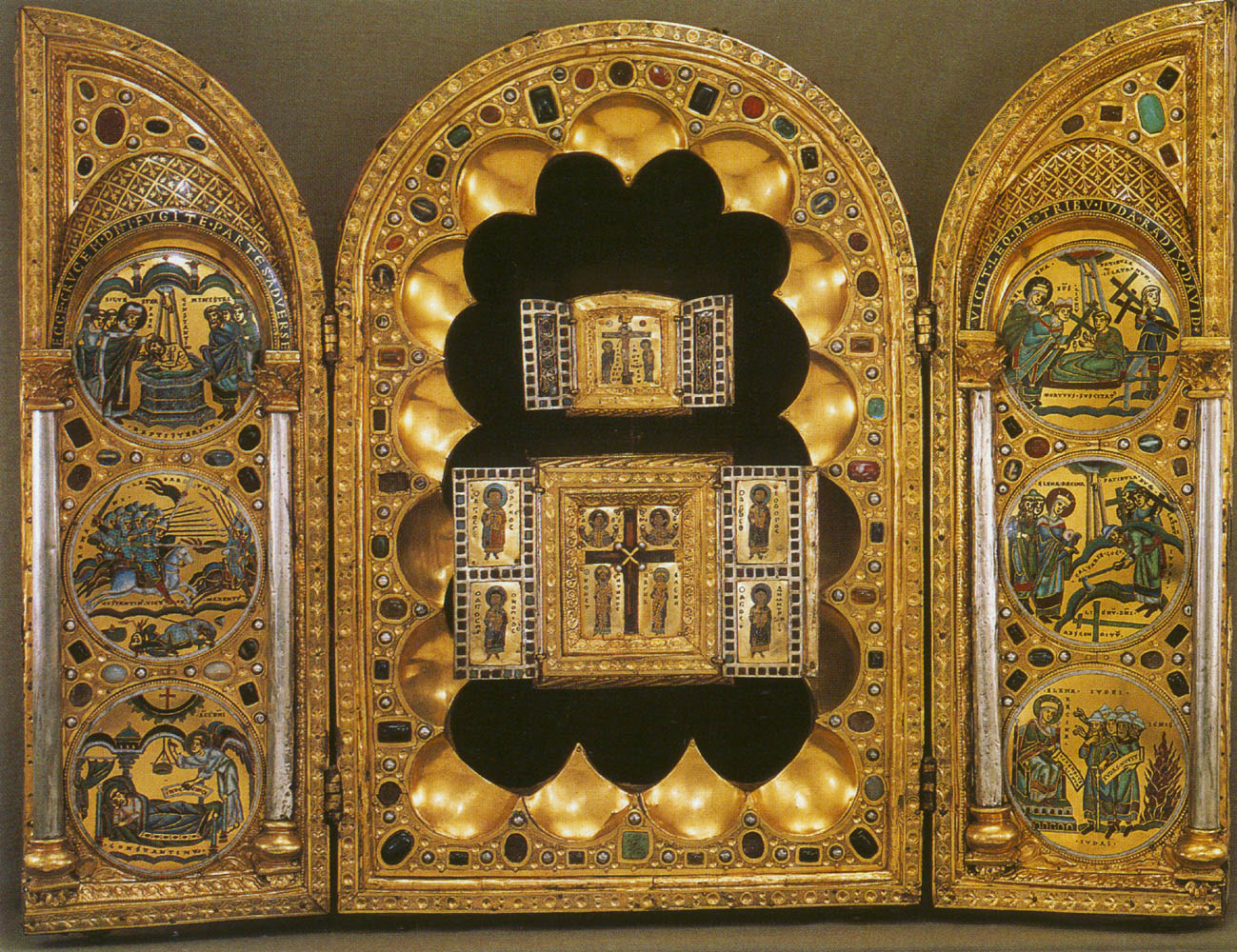
Stavelot Triptych, Mosan, Belgium, c. 1156–58. 48×66 cm with wings open, The Morgan Library & Museum, New York City

The Stavelot Triptych is a medieval reliquary and portable altar in gold and enamel intended to protect, honor and display pieces of the True Cross. Created by Mosan artists—"Mosan" signifies the valley of the Meuse river—around 1156 at Stavelot Abbey in present-day Belgium. The work is a masterpiece of Romanesque goldsmith's work and is today in the Morgan Library & Museum in New York City.

== Description ==
The Stavelot Triptych is a three-part winged shrine; with the wings open its dimensions are 19 in (480 mm) in height by 26 in (660 mm) in width. In such a triptych, the outer wings protect (when swung shut) the middle section, which contains two smaller triptychs, each containing pieces of the True Cross. The black velvet background is modern, originally it was a golden field inlaid with semi-precious stones – see for example the Cross of Lothair. The two inner triptychs are cloisonné enamel, a technique typical of Byzantine work; the six larger medallions (three on each outer wing) are in the champlevé technique which had by then largely replaced cloisonné in the West, and in which "Mosan" metalworkers were the leading artists in Europe.

The outer triptych is of Mosan origin, built to house the two inner triptychs of Byzantine origin, which predate the outer one by some decades. The artists are unknown, although other works have been suggested as coming from the same workshop. We do not know with certainty who ordered it, or who paid for it. The Benedictine monastery of Stavelot ruled the Principality of Stavelot-Malmedy, a small statelet in the Holy Roman Empire, and in this period commissioned a number of magnificent pieces of religious metalwork, as well as apparently running a scriptorium which produced some significant illuminated manuscripts, most notably the Stavelot Bible of 1093–97. We know that Prince-Abbot Wibald (1098–1158), was sent on a diplomatic mission to Constantinople by the Emperor Frederick Barbarossa in 1154. It is theorized Wibald received the two smaller triptychs as diplomatic gifts from the Byzantine Emperor Manuel I Comnenus, and after his return commissioned Mosan artists to create the larger outer triptych. The Triptych was certainly in the Abbey when it was suppressed in 1792, after the French Revolution. The last prince-abbot, Célestin Thys, carried the triptych to Germany during the Napoleonic Wars, where it remained until 1910, when purchased by a London dealer who sold it to J. P. Morgan.

Of the inner triptychs, both mostly in gold and enamel, the lower, larger one has two slivers of wood of the True Cross forming a cross. Around this on the central panel are enamel standing figures of Constantine on the left and Saint Helena (Constantine's mother who originally found the True Cross) on the right, below busts of archangels. An X-shaped fixture, with pearls at each of the four ends, holds the cross together. The insides of the wings contain four military saints: George and Procopius on the left, Theodore and Demetrius on the right. The outsides of the wings have figures of the Four Evangelists.

The upper, smaller triptych held relics of the True Cross, Holy Sepulchre, and the robe of the Virgin Mary. The central panel has a Crucifixion with the Virgin Mary and Saint John the Evangelist standing beside the cross, with the sun and the moon above the cross. The insides of the wings have geometric decoration, while the outsides have an Annunciation to Mary.

The outer wings of the main triptych contain enamel medallions with narrative scenes from the legends of the True Cross, stories well known in the Middle Ages. Over the top of the two top medallions is inscribed:

Behold the Cross of the Lord, flee you hostile powers
The Lion of the Tribe of Judah, the Root of David has conquered

The three medallions on the left wing tell the story of Constantine's conversion to Christianity. Starting with the bottom medallion on the left wing, it pictures the medieval version of the legend of Constantine having a dream the night before the Battle of the Milvian Bridge, where he dreams an angel appears, points to the Cross, and tells him he will conquer under that sign. The middle medallion shows Constantine's victory at the Milvian bridge, with a cross standard. The upper medallion shows Constantine being baptized just before his death, by Pope Sylvester I, below an approving Hand of God.

The three medallions on the right wing tell the story of Saint Helena's discovery of the True Cross. Starting with the bottom medallion on the right wing, Helena questions Jewish leaders (wearing Jewish hats) about the location of the Cross. In the middle medallion, Helena watches as servants dig up the Cross on Mount Calvary, below a pointing Hand of God; the two thieves crosses have already been excavated. In the upper medallion, Helena is testing the three crosses on a sick man to find the one True Cross that has the healing powers.

As well as the masterly goldsmith's work and beauty of the Stavelot Triptych, it remains instructive as a demonstration of the diverging Eastern and Western Christian artistic traditions in the Romanesque period. Not only are the enamel techniques different between the outer triptych and the smaller inner triptychs, but the way images and ideas are expressed are very different. Eastern Byzantine artists use static, hierarchal figures frozen in place, silently adoring Christ and the cross. In contrast, the Western artists use narrative storytelling with animated figures acting out dramatic visions, battles and miracles.

== Bibliography ==
- Charles Ryskamp (1980). The Stavelot Triptych. Mosan Art and the Legend of the True Cross. New York: Pierpont Morgan Library / Oxford University Press. ISBN 0-19-520225-2.
- Marilyn Stokstad (2004). Medieval art. Westview Press Inc. ISBN 0-8133-3681-3.
- Stavelot Reliquary on Corsair, the Online Catalog of The Morgan Library & Museum.
- Stavelot Reliquary on the Christian Iconography website of J. Richard Stracke, emeritus professor of English at Augusta State University.
- Stavelot Triptych. Zoomable image from The Morgan Library & Museum.
