= Princely Abbey of Stavelot-Malmedy =

Ecclesiastical state of the Holy Roman Empire

Coordinates: 50°23′N 5°56′E

Princely Abbey of Stavelot-Malmedy: Principauté abbatiale de Stavelot-Malmedy (French); Preensdom Stavelot-Malmedy (Limburgish); Abdijvorstendom Stavelot en Malmedy (Dutch); Fürstabtei Stablo-Malmedy (German)
- 651–1795
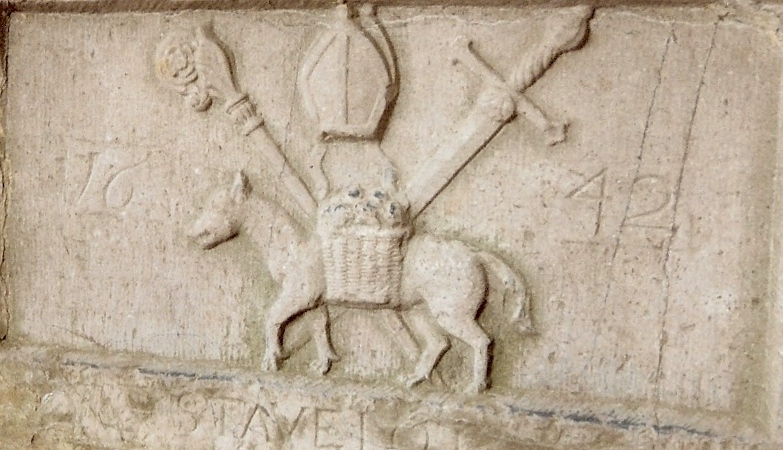
- Coat of arms

- Stavelot-Malmedy, as at 1560, within the Lower Rhenish–Westphalian Circle
- Status: Imperial Abbey of the Holy Roman Empire
- Capital: Stavelot
- Government: Elective principality
- Historical era: Middle Ages
  - Malmedy abb. founded: 648
  - Stavelot abbey founded: 651
  - Abbot Poppo of Deinze: 1020–48
  - Abbot Wibald: 1130–58
  - Annexed by France: 1794
  - Creation of Ourthe: 1795
  - Congress of Vienna*: 9 June 1815
Preceded by	Succeeded by
Frankish Empire / Carolingian Empire	Ourthe (department)
- Today part of: Belgium
- * Stavelot to United Kingdom of the Netherlands; Malmedy to Prussian province of Jülich-Cleves-Berg.

The Princely Abbey of Stavelot-Malmedy, also Principality of Stavelot-Malmedy, sometimes known with its German name Stablo, was an ecclesiastical principality of the Holy Roman Empire. Princely power was exercised by the Benedictine abbot of the imperial double monastery of Stavelot and Malmedy, founded in 651. Along with the Duchy of Bouillon and the Prince-Bishopric of Liège, it was one of only three principalities of the Southern Netherlands that were never part of the Spanish Netherlands, later the Austrian Netherlands, which after 1500 were assigned to the Burgundian Circle while the principalities were assigned to the Lower Rhenish Imperial Circle.

As a prince-abbot, the abbot of Stavelot-Malmedy sat on the Ecclesiastical Bench of the College of Ruling Princes of the Imperial Diet alongside the prince-bishops. Along with the handful of other prince-abbots, he cast a full vote (votum virile), in contrast to the majority of imperial abbots who were only entitled to collectively determine the votes of their respective curial benches.

In 1795, the principality was abolished and its territory was incorporated into the French département of Ourthe. The Congress of Vienna in 1815 assigned Stavelot to the United Kingdom of the Netherlands, and Malmedy became part of the Prussian district of Eupen-Malmedy. Both are currently parts of the Kingdom of Belgium—since the 1830 Belgian Revolution and the 1919 Treaty of Versailles, respectively (Malmedy annexed to Belgium in 1925). In 1921 the Abbey church of Malmedy became the Cathedral of the short-lived Diocese of Eupen-Malmedy.

== History ==
=== Establishment ===
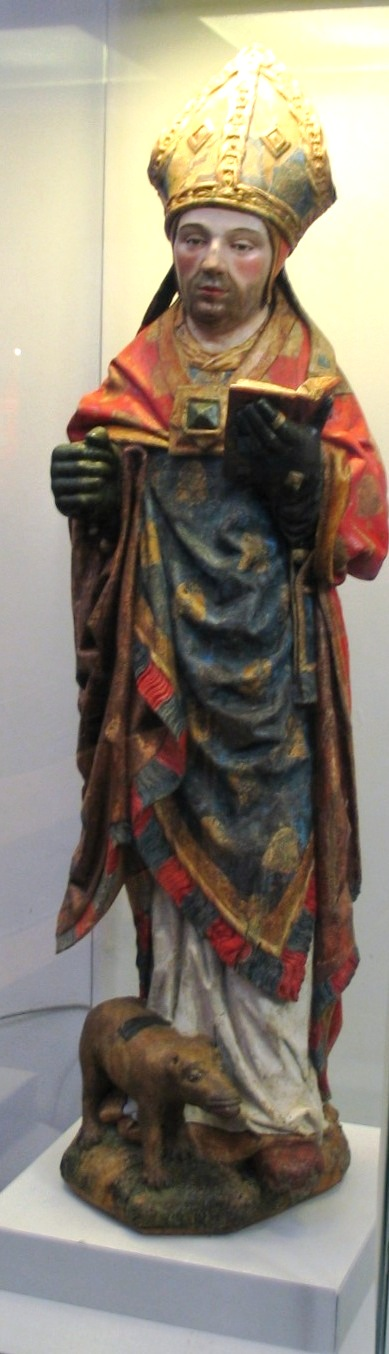
Saint Remaclus

Saint Remaclus founded the Abbey of Stavelot on the Amblève river, circa 650, on lands along the border between the bishoprics of Cologne and Tongeren, this territory belonged at that time to Grimoald, the Austrasian mayor of the palace and member of the Arnulfinger-Peppinid family. A charter of Sigebert III, king of Austrasia entrusted Remaclus with the monasteries of both Stavelot and Malmedy, which was located a few kilometres eastwards in the Ardennes forest, "a place of horror and solitary isolation which abounds with wild beasts". Sigebert granted forest land; charged his Mayor of the Palace, Grimoald the Elder, with furnishing money to build the two monasteries; and continued to foster these communities with personal gifts.

The site of Malmedy was probably already settled before the foundation of the abbey, despite etymology seeming to indicate Malmedy's unsuitability. Mal(u)mund(a)-arium was "a place with winding waters", or, most probably, Malmund-arium, a "bad confluency". The Warchenne was partially canalised and its banks strengthened, to prevent the flooding that Malmedy often experienced. The abbey church in Malmedy was dedicated to St Benedict. The monastery of Malmedy is considered by historians and hagiographers to be slightly older than the monastery of Stavelot, with the town claiming its foundation date as 648. Malmedy is listed on earlier maps than Stavelot, and the commission appointed in 670 by Childeric II, in order to delimit the abbey territory, started from Malmedy (Latin: de Monasterio Malmunderio). Afterwards, the territory of the abbey was enlarged westwards, so that Stavelot became the geographical centre and the capital of the principality.

The first church in Stavelot was built by abbot Godwin and, on 25 June 685, was dedicated to saints Martin, Peter, and Paul. The relics of Saint Remaclus were housed in this new church.

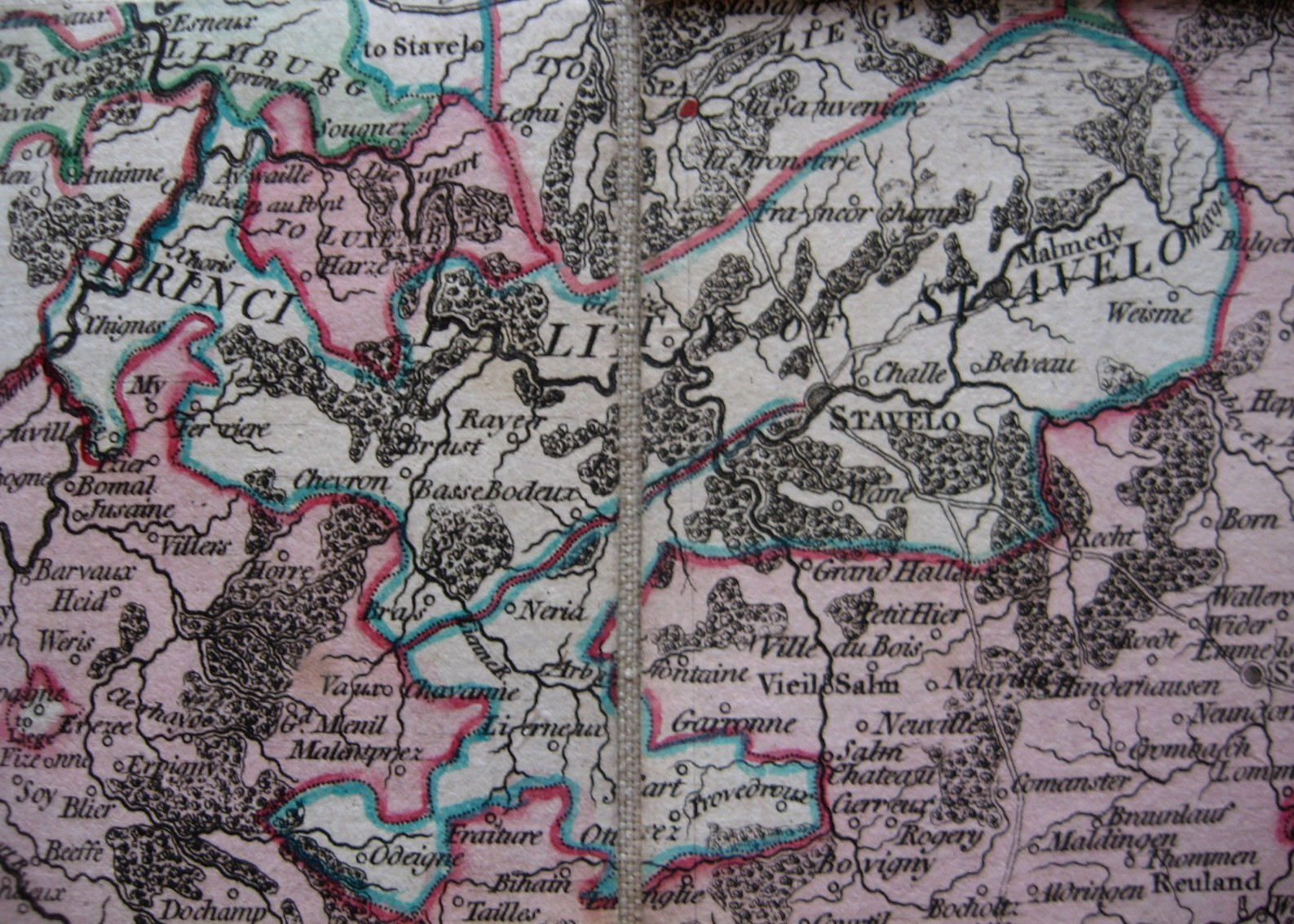
Territory of Stavelot-Malmedy

=== Development and the High Middle Ages ===
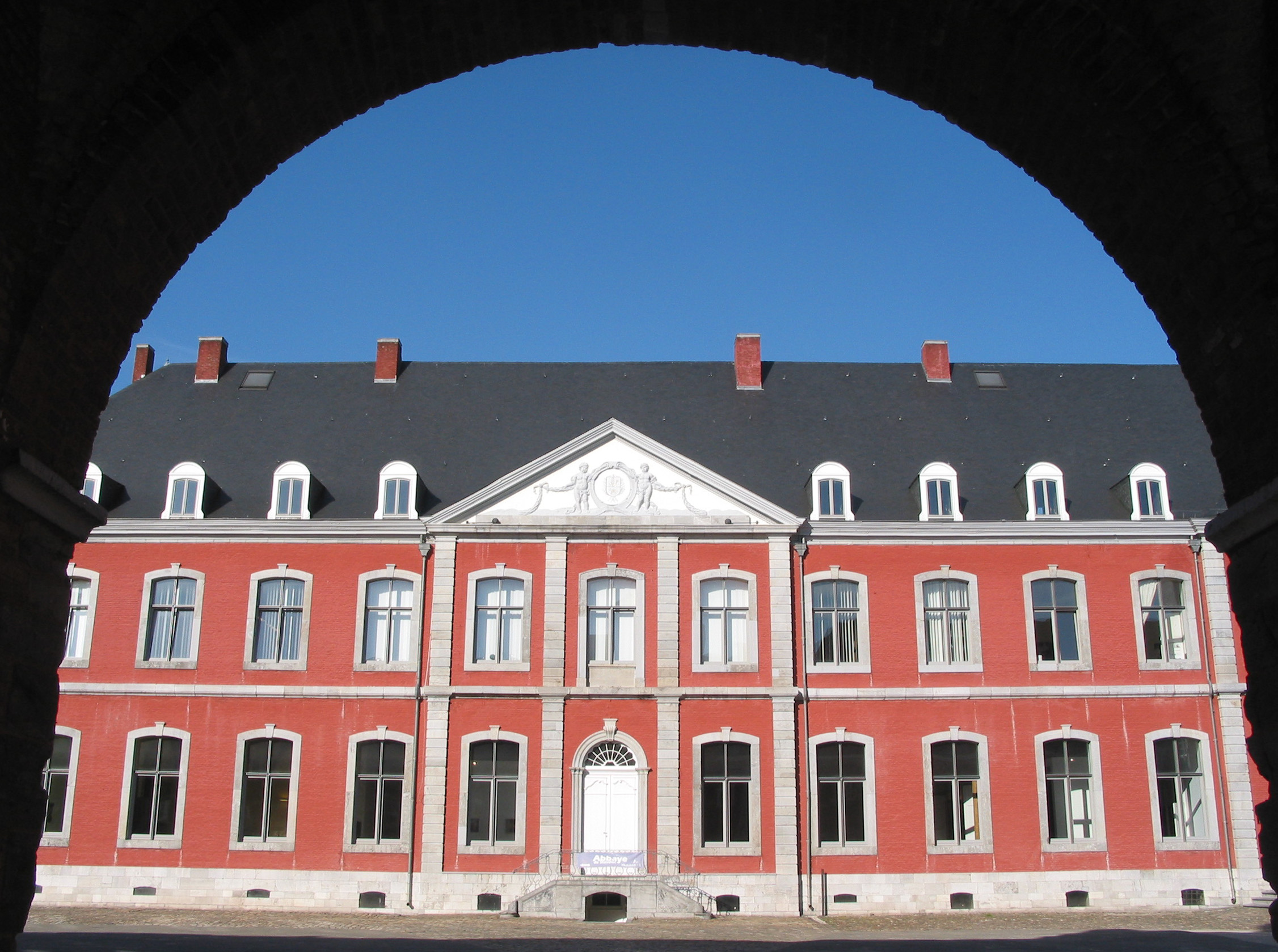
Stavelot Abbey

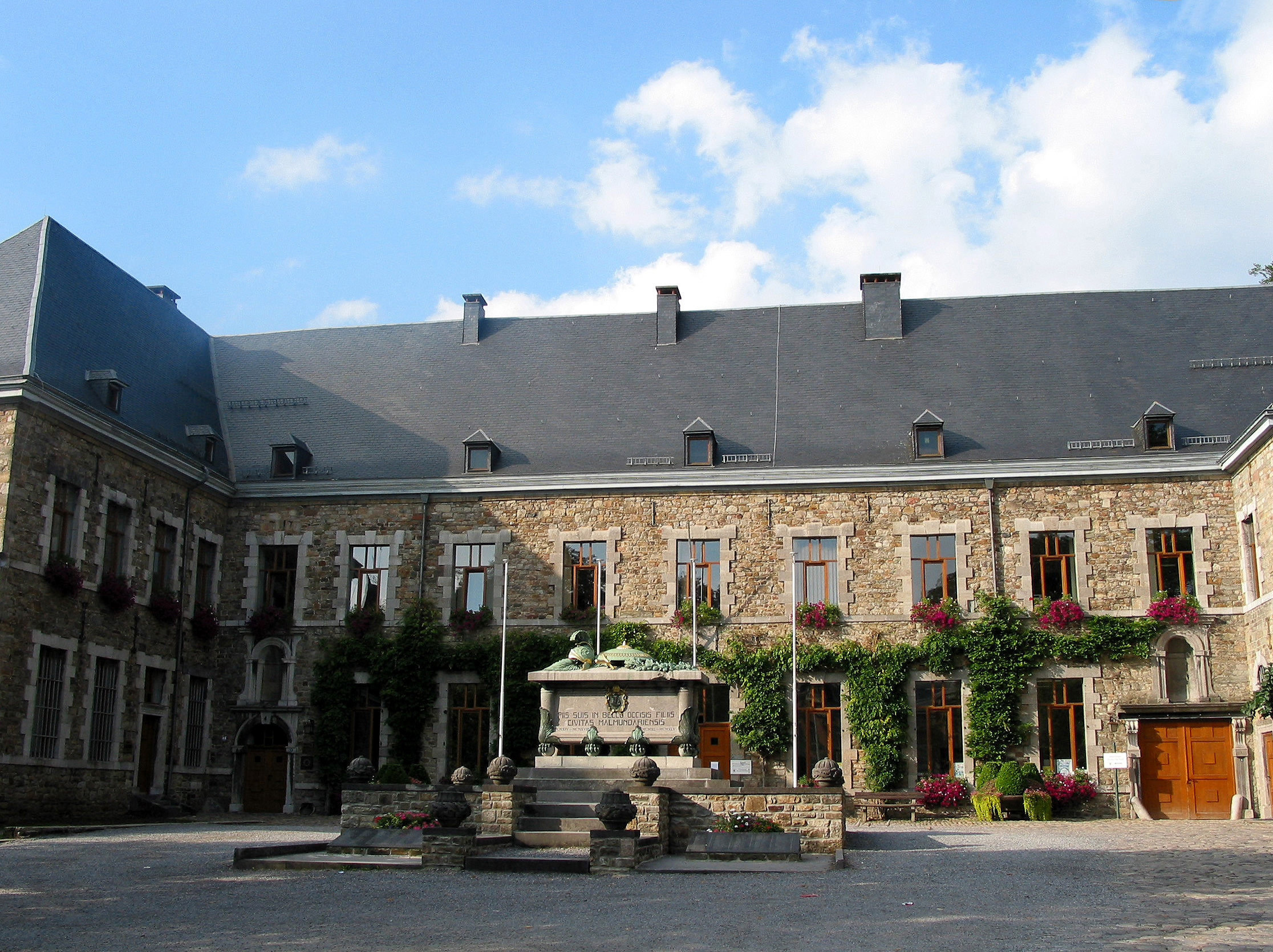
Malmedy Abbey

In 747, Carloman, Duke of the Franks and Mayor of the Palace of Austrasia, enlarged the abbeys' lands with gifts from his own, on his abdication. Throughout the ninth century, the abbeys played an important cultural role in Lotharingia, particularly thanks to abbot Christian. Around 875, the relics of St Quirinus were translated from Gasny to Malmedy Abbey after the intercession of Emperor Charles the Bald, partly to secure relics comparable to those of St. Remaclus at Stavelot.

Through the seventh and eighth centuries, the two abbeys followed their mission of evangelism, along with forest clearance. With the decline of the Carolingian Empire, however, the abbeys suffered the same decay as elsewhere, leaving the principality in the custody of lay abbots—temporal guardians—from 844 to 938, including Ebbo, Archbishop of Reims, Adalard the Seneschal, and Reginar and Giselbert, dukes of Lorraine.

Welcoming pilgrims and the sick was a part of the monks' mission. The Miracula sancti Remacli mention the xenodochium, the monastery's hospice, where poor pilgrims were granted hospitality, including food for almost eight days, whilst they made their devotions; this hospice differs from the abbey's hospital: hospitale coenobii. On 13 April 862, Lothair II of Lotharingia, while dealing with the distribution of property ad hospital ejusdem coenobii, ordered that local tithes be paid to the hospital absque netligentia et tarditate, an order he confirmed on 10 June 873.

In December 881, Normans, including Godfrid, Duke of Frisia, invaded the area, burning both abbeys and causing the monks to flee with their treasures and relics. Several historical sources provide evidence of the raid of 881, which was well prepared and organised. The monks rushed to dig up the relics of Remaclus and fled to the county of Porcien in present-day Bogny-sur-Meuse, in the French Ardennes; the surrounding region was largely unaffected by the invasion. Stavelot and Malmedy were both burned, with the monks not returning until just before Christmas 882, with a stay in Chooz, to allow them to repair the roofs of the monastic buildings. Relics from Aachen, which had been entrusted to the monks at Stavelot because of the Norman threat, were returned intact. In gratitude, on 13 November 882, Charles the Fat—Carolingian emperor and king of East Francia, Alemannia, and Italy—granted the abbeys the lands of Blendef, a dependency of Louveigné, and restored to them the chapel in Bra (now a part of Lierneux in Liège).

In 885, Normans extracted ransom from Hesbaye and passed through the Meuse valley, marching on Prüm, causing the monks of Stavelot to flee again, finding refuge in the county of Logne and Chèvremont; the Miracula Remacli details the flight from the invaders and follows the monks' wanderings. After the invasions, abbot Odilon began to rebuild the ruined abbey of Stavelot, with support from bishops of Liège—including Notker, the first prince-bishop. The abbots Odilon and Werinfride rebuilt the abbeys, with new building; re-established the monastic community; re-organised the principality. By the time of the Ottonian dynasty in the early 10th century, the abbeys were once again of suitable Imperial stature. A new abbey church was built in Malmedy in 992, dedicated to St Quirinus; in 1007, a parish church was consecrated to Saint Gereon.

Another danger threatened the abbey—and the Western Empire—in the 10th century: the Hungarian invasions. Having been deposed as duke of Lotharingia, Conrad the Red invited the Hungarians to undermine his opponents, Bruno the Great, archbishop of Cologne, and Reginar III, Count of Hainaut. The Annales Stabulensis reports: Anno 954 Ungri populantur regiones Galliæ ... Anno 955. Victoria de Ungris ["In the year 954, Hungarians ravage the regions of Gaul ... In the year 955, victory over the Hungarians"]. On 1 July 960, Eraclus, bishop of Liège, driven by the fears of the time, granted the monks a place to build a refuge in Liège, although five years earlier, the victory of emperor Otto I over the Hungarians at Lechfeld had removed the danger of Hungarian sack.

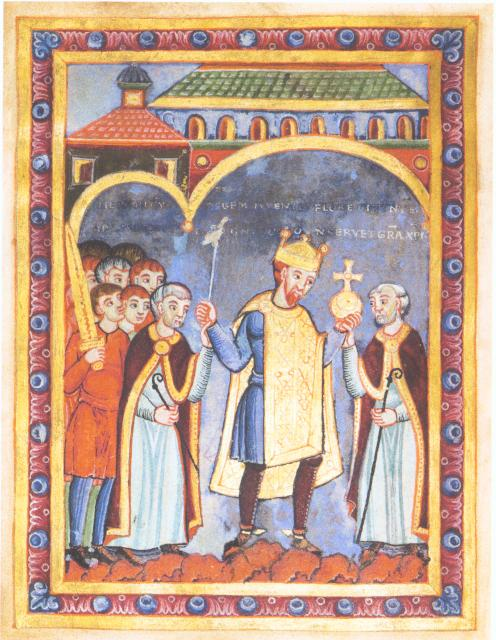
Henry III, Holy Roman Emperor, who was present for the 1040 consecration of the church built in Stavelot under prince-abbot Poppo of Deinze.

The key building period at the abbey of Stavelot corresponds to the rule of prince-abbot Poppo of Deinze, the second founder of the abbey, who was made abbot by Holy Roman Emperor Henry II in 1020. He built an imposing church over 100 metres (330 ft) in length, which was consecrated in the presence of Emperor Henry III on 5 June 1040. Thietmar was the lay patron who assembled carpenters and stonemasons to build the abbey church. As well as confirming the authenticity of the relics of St Quirinus at Malmedy in 1042, Poppo revived the cult of St Remaclus. Poppo died in 1048; his cult, which began almost immediately, focused on his resting place in the crypt. Malmedy developed around the monastery; until the end of the tenth century, the villagers used the chapel of Saint Laurent, an apsidiole of the abbey church, as their place of worship.

In 1065, controversy arose when Anno II, Archbishop of Cologne, named Tegernon of Brauweiler abbot of Malmedy, on dubious authority—whilst Malmedy was in the archdiocese of Cologne, the two abbeys were linked and, thus, under the purview of the diocese of Liège, where Stavelot lay. This occurred despite several previous Imperial bulls reinforcing the position that the two abbeys should be subject to a single abbot. The monks from Stavelot processed to Malmedy with the crosier and relics of St Remaclus to remind the rebellious monks of the traditional ordering of the abbeys that the saint had instituted. The relics and crosier were also transported to an Imperial Diet of Henry IV in Goslar. In 1066, they processed again, this time to Aachen and Fritzlar; they processed to Bitburg and Bamberg the following year. That their prayers were not answered apparently led the monks to despair that the relics were becoming impotent or that the monks were being punished by their patron; in 1067 and 1068, abbot Thierry even went to Rome to appeal to Pope Alexander II. This impasse lasted for a further three years, until Henry held court at Liège during Easter in 1071; with great ceremony, the monks processed with Remaclus's relics to meet with his legendary fellow bishop St Lambert, joined en route by the relics of St Symmetrus. Numerous miracles convinced the emperor to recognise the union of the two abbeys and reiterate the superiority of Stavelot, forcing Anno eventually to capitulate. A rejoiceful procession back to Stavelot paused en route to celebrate Mass on the banks of the Meuse; finally, the monks processed with Remaclus's relics to the abbey at Malmedy, to symbolise the restoration of his and their authority. This series of episodes is recounted in the heroic narrative of the Triumph of St Remaclus and confirmed by several contemporary sources.

In 1098, Wibald was born in the hamlet of Chevrouheid, near Stavelot. Elected prince-abbot in 1130, he played a key role in the religious life of the region and the abbeys. In 1138, he granted permission for the castle to be built in Logne, first mentioned in an 862 abbey charter. In the 12th to 15th centuries, however, the abbacy experienced a slow decline. In the 14th and 15th centuries, several Imperial edicts, initially issued by Emperor Charles IV, put the abbacy under the protection of the counts of Luxembourg.

=== Early Modern Age ===
In 1509, William of Manderscheid organised a procession to induce the recalcitrant county of Logne, a fief of the abbey, to submit to his jurisdiction. The cortège was pious, rather than fraught with tension; with Stavelot monks carrying the shrines of Remaclus and Babolene with other reliquaries; and the monks of Malmedy with reliquaries of Quirinus, Just, Peter, and Philip; joined by parishioners from Lierneux with the relics of Symmetrus. In 1521, after the castle in Logne had been dismantled, William added "Count of Logne" to the abbots' titles, with the county representing most of the western portion of the principality's territory.

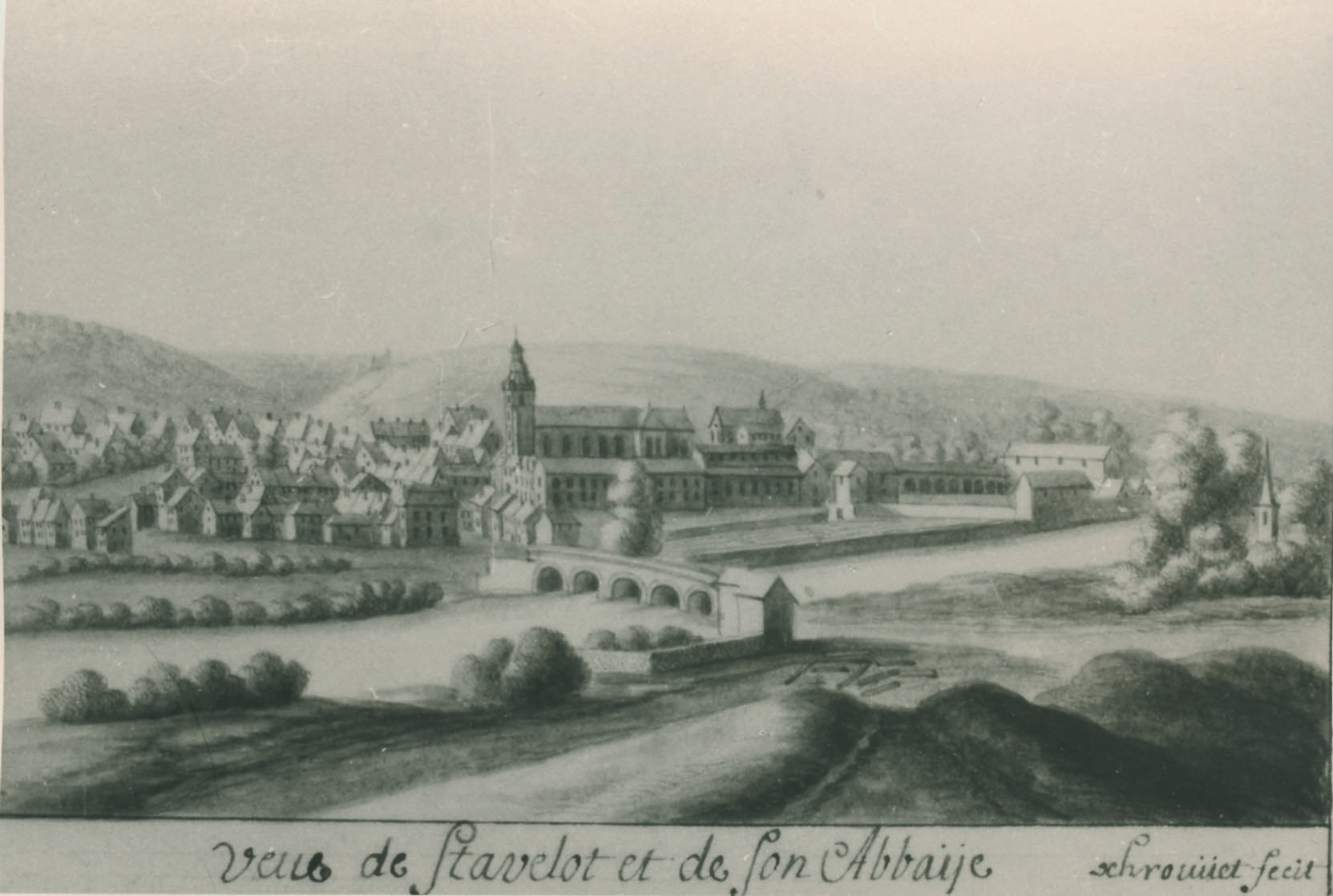
The town and abbey of Stavelot, c. 1735

The abbey church served as a monastic church and as a church of pilgrimage until the French Revolution. Its imposing gatehouse tower was rebuilt in 1534; (its ground floor and some further foundation still remain). Malmedy began to flourish particularly in the 16th century with the development of tannery; in 1544 there were only 216 houses with a thousand inhabitants, but that more than tripled by 1635.

After the death of abbot Christopher of Manderscheid, there was a series of absent abbots, including Maximilian Henry of Bavaria (also bishop of Liège and of Hildesheim), who reformed the abbey in 1656. In the 17th century, Stavelot and Malmedy were major centres of tanning in Europe. Papermaking was particularly important to Malmedy, as was the manufacture of gunpowder. Other industries included cotton manufacturing, manufacture of chess sets and dominoes, and gingerbread baking. In 1659, a Capuchin convent was built in Stavelot.

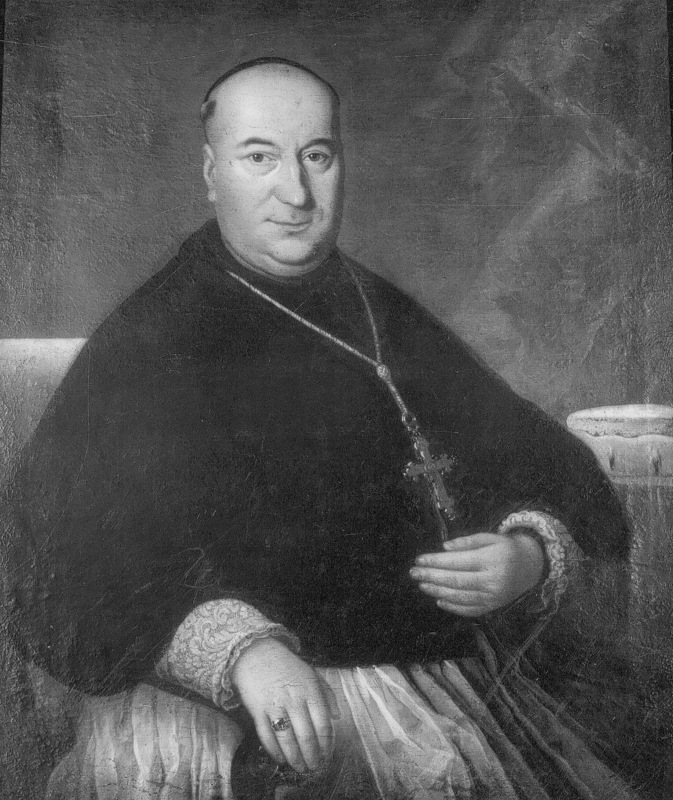
Prince-abbot Alexandre Delmotte (1753–1766)

Despite the abbacy's neutrality and the protection of the prince-abbots, the territory was invaded at least 50 times by troops passing through, whose depredations had disastrous consequences for the population, including the 4 October 1689 razing of both Stavelot and Malmedy on the orders of Nicolas Catinat, general to Louis XIV of France, during the Nine Years' War. In Stavelot, the entire town, including over 360 houses, was destroyed, leaving just the abbey and its farmyard standing. In Malmedy, some 600 out of the 660 houses of the town were destroyed and it took more than a century to completely rebuild. Malmedy's 1601 city walls had previously been destroyed by French troops in 1658, during the 1635–59 Franco-Spanish War. The wars—and passage by troops of Brandenburg-Prussia, the Dutch Republic, France, and Liège—had cost the principality the sum of 2.75 million Reichsthaler. The abbey had to borrow 134 000 thalers from Liège and Verviers; another loan, shared amongst the communities, totalled 109 000 thalers, with annual interest of 14 161 thalers and arrears of 26 000 thalers.

By the start of the 18th century the principality had lost a third of its territory, as a result of war, fires, pillage, and unjust encroachments. The deputies to the Imperial Diet complained that, in the 16th century, the Spanish Netherlands had seized several territories and that the Bishopric of Liège had stolen over half a dozen seigneuries totalling over 2000 households; adding that the principality itself retained only 1693 households, having had 3780 households before the upheavals and that the suffering of the principality had caused some of the richest and most powerful families to emigrate. The Imperial Diet was moved to halve the Reichsmatrikel for the abbeys (reducing the sums and troops the abbeys needed to provide towards the Imperial army) and exempting any need for the abbeys to send troops to the Imperial army for three years, an exemption extended for four more years on 24 March 1715.

=== Abolition ===
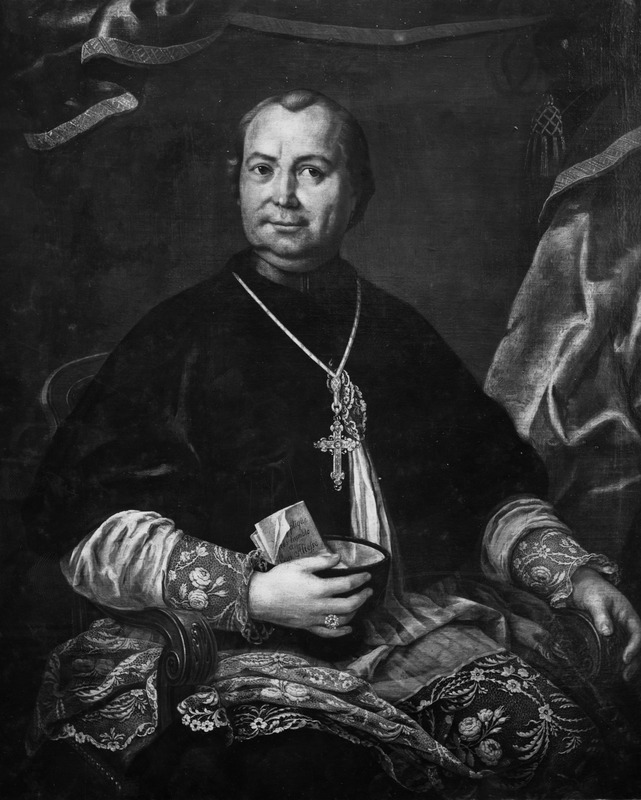
Célestin Thys, the last prince-abbot

During the French Revolutionary Wars, from 1793 to 1804, the abbey was abandoned by the monks and the principality extinguished. Stavelot was incorporated into the French Republic by a decree of 2 March 1793, along with Franchimont and Logne. Despite opposition from local notables, Malmedy was similarly incorporated by a decree of 9 Vendémiaire of the Year IV (1 October 1795). Stavelot abbey itself was sacked and the church sold and demolished; of the church just the western doorway remains, as a free-standing tower. Two cloisters—one secular, one for the monks—survive as the courtyards of the brick-and-stone 17th-century domestic ranges. The foundations of the abbey church are presented as a footprint, with walls and column bases that enable the visitor to visualize the scale of the Romanesque abbey.

== Geography and administration ==
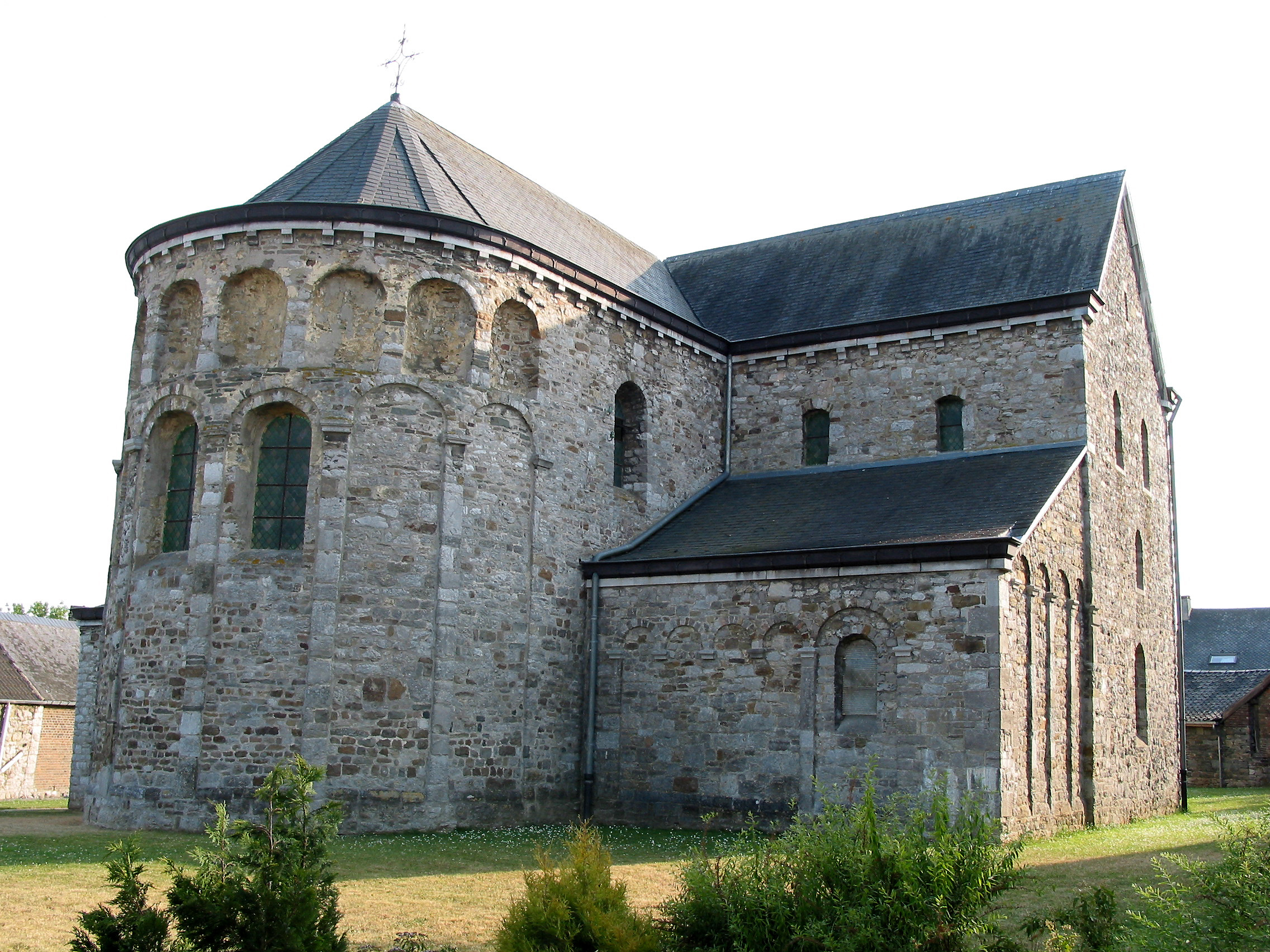
11th-century church of St Médard in Xhignesse

Based largely in the Amblève and Ourthe river valleys, the principality occupied a substantial proportion of what is now the arrondissement of Verviers in the province of Liège. By the time of the French Revolution, the principality was bounded on the north by the duchy of Limburg, on the south and east by the duchy of Luxembourg and on the north-west by the marquisate of Franchimont and the Condroz. The principality was divided into three administrative districts: the postelleries of Stavelot and Malmedy, and the county of Logne, totalling around 28,000 inhabitants. The postellerie of Stavelot contained 14 communities and that of Malmedy contained the town itself and the bans of Waimes and Francorchamps. The county of Logne was divided into four quartiers: Hamoir (7 communities), Ocquier (6), Comblain (5) and Louveigné (2), with public assemblies being based in Bernardfagne. In addition, six other communities were exclaves, and there were the seigneuries of Anthisnes and Vien, in the Confroz. In 1768, these two seigneuries were exchanged with Liège for Chooz, Sclessin, and Ougrée.

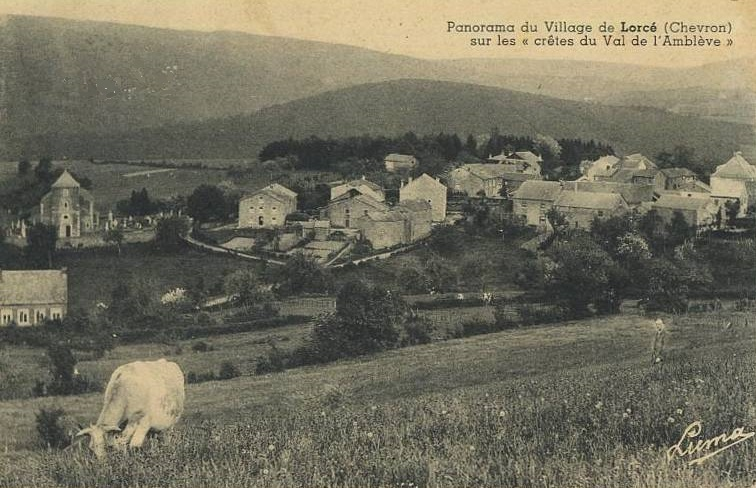
Lorcé belonged to Stavelot, like a number of other villages in the Ardennes

Several sources note that there were disputes between the two abbeys, with Stavelot assuming primacy over Malmedy, to the latter's discontent; though new abbots were invested in Stavelot on behalf of both abbeys. Whilst an absolute principality, in some matters the prince-abbot would consult a general assembly or états of clergy, dignitaries, prince's officers, mayors, and aldermen, whose main role was to vote for taxes. Each of the three districts had its own provincial assembly and court, with a Princely Council for highly contested cases. As a court of last resort, citizens could appeal to the Reichskammergericht (Imperial Chamber Court), created by Emperor Maximilian I (reigned 1508–19) on the model of the parliaments in Paris and Mechelen and headquartered in Frankfurt (1495–1527), Speyer (1527–1693) and Wetzlar (1693–1806).

Shortly before the principality's extinction, it contributed just over 81 Reichsthaler per session for the maintenance of the Imperial Chamber Court, from annual revenues of around 25 000 Rhenish guilder.

== Art ==
The abbeys at Stavelot and Malmedy commissioned some of the finest surviving works of Mosan art, one of the leading schools of Romanesque art, especially in goldsmith metalwork, which was then the most prestigious art form. Their collections were dispersed by wars and, finally, the French Revolution. Works from the abbeys are now in museums across the world. The illuminated manuscript Stavelot Bible (now in the British Library) was probably the abbey's main bible, and was created there by several hands over a four-year period ending in 1097 (other works have been identified as being from the same scriptorium). The bible has been described as "a perfect microcosm of the influences and interests that gave rise to the first Romanesque painting". A group of manuscripts from the less productive scriptorium at Malmedy were donated to the Vatican Library in 1816 by Pope Pius VII, including the Malmedy Bible and two lectionaries from about 1300. Malmedy illuminations show a particular closeness with metalwork styles.

Abbot Wibald (ruled 1130–58) was an important Imperial minister and diplomat, and was regarded as one of the greatest patrons of Mosan art in its best period, although much of the evidence for this is circumstantial. Some of his surviving letters discuss works which may be identifiable with existing pieces, and an "aurifaber G", who some have identified with Godefroid de Claire, a shadowy figure to whom many masterpieces are attributed. Several important commissions were certainly placed by Wibald with Mosan workshops of goldsmiths and metalworkers, and other works later connected with Stavelot are also presumed to have been commissioned by him. The works, mostly champlevé enamels of very high quality, include the Stavelot Triptych, a portable altar reliquary for two fragments of the True Cross, c. 1156, (now in the Morgan Library & Museum in New York), the Stavelot Portable Altar of 1146, and a head-shaped reliquary of Pope Alexander II, c. 1150, possibly by Godefroid (both now Cinquantenaire Museum, Brussels). A gold relief retable of the Pentecost (1160–70) is in the Musée national du Moyen Âge in Paris. An important and more elaborate retable of Saint Remaclus, of about 1150, about nine square metres in extent, was broken up during the French Revolution; and only two round enamel plaques survive, in Berlin and Frankfurt, though a 17th-century drawing survives in Liège.

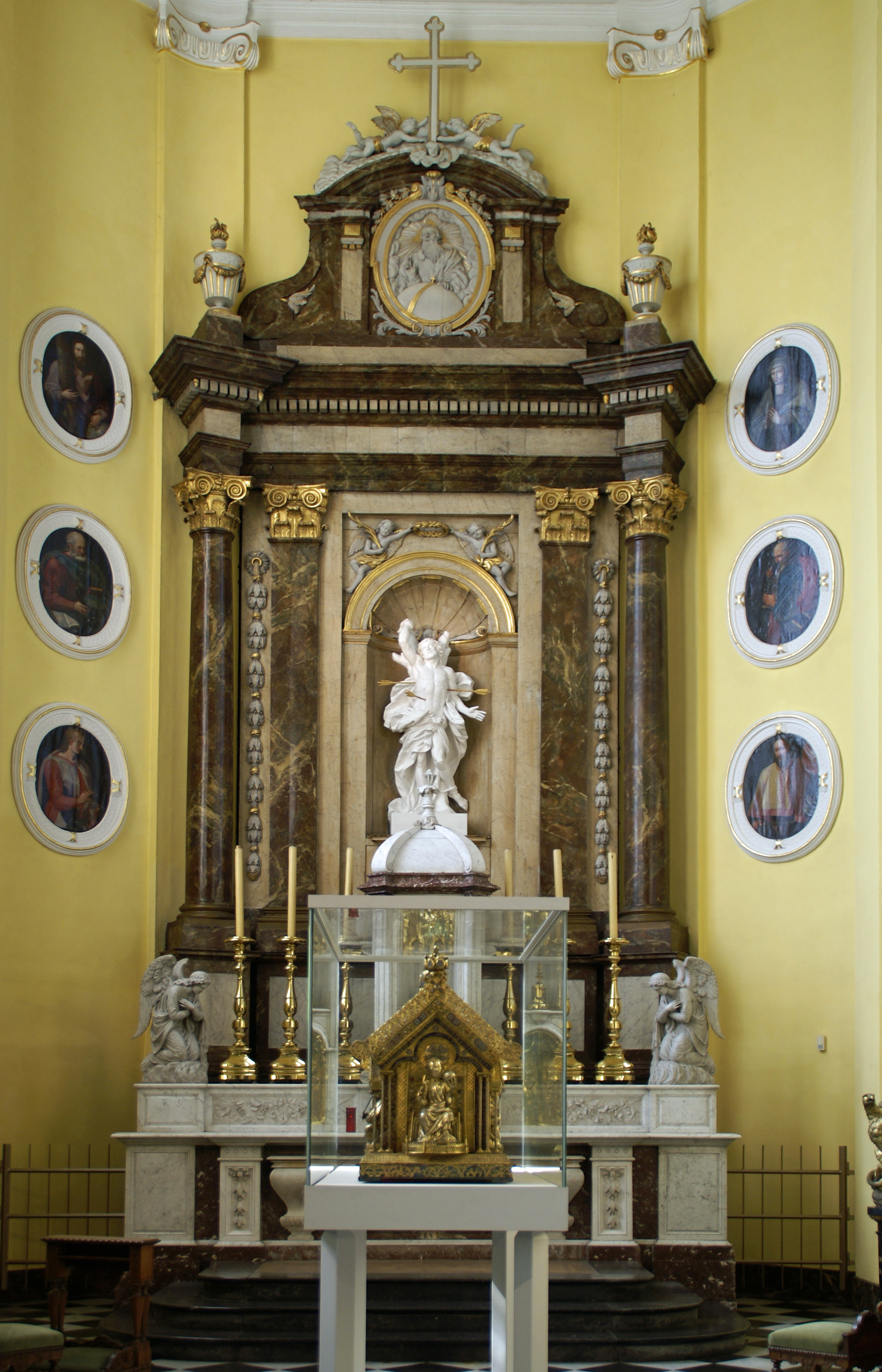
Statue of St Sebastian and reliquary of Remaclus

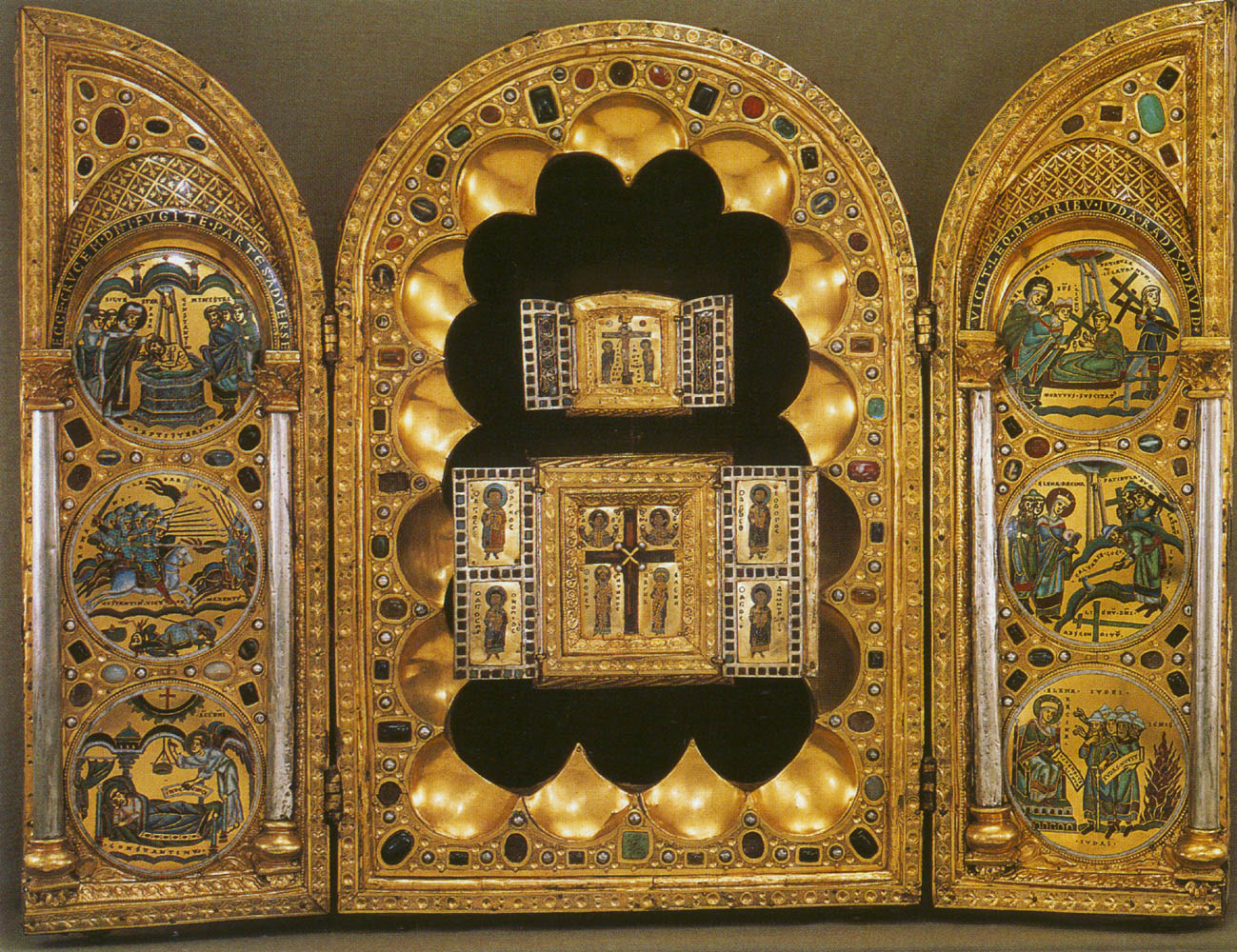
Stavelot Triptych

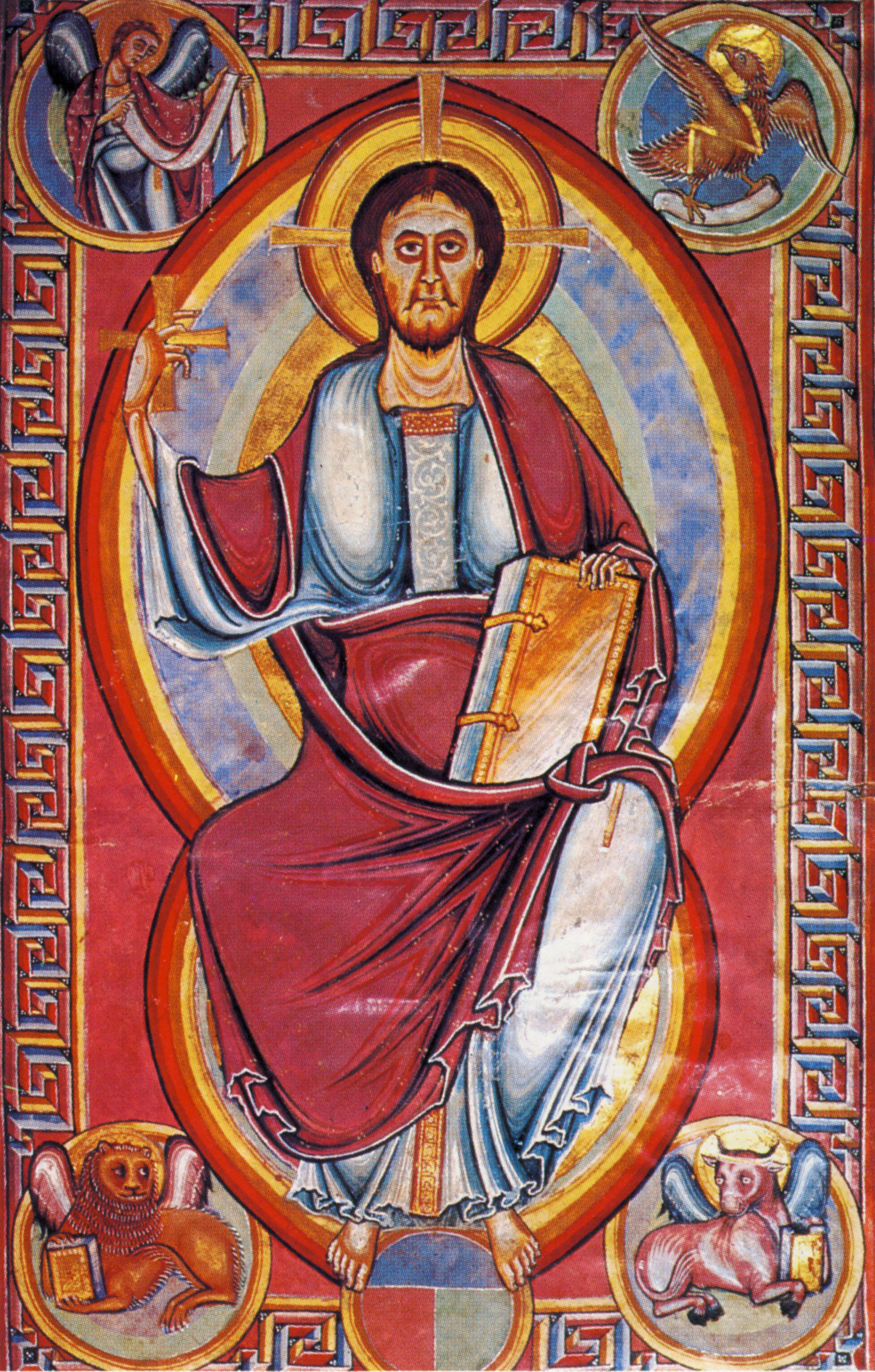
Christ in Majesty from the Stavelot Bible

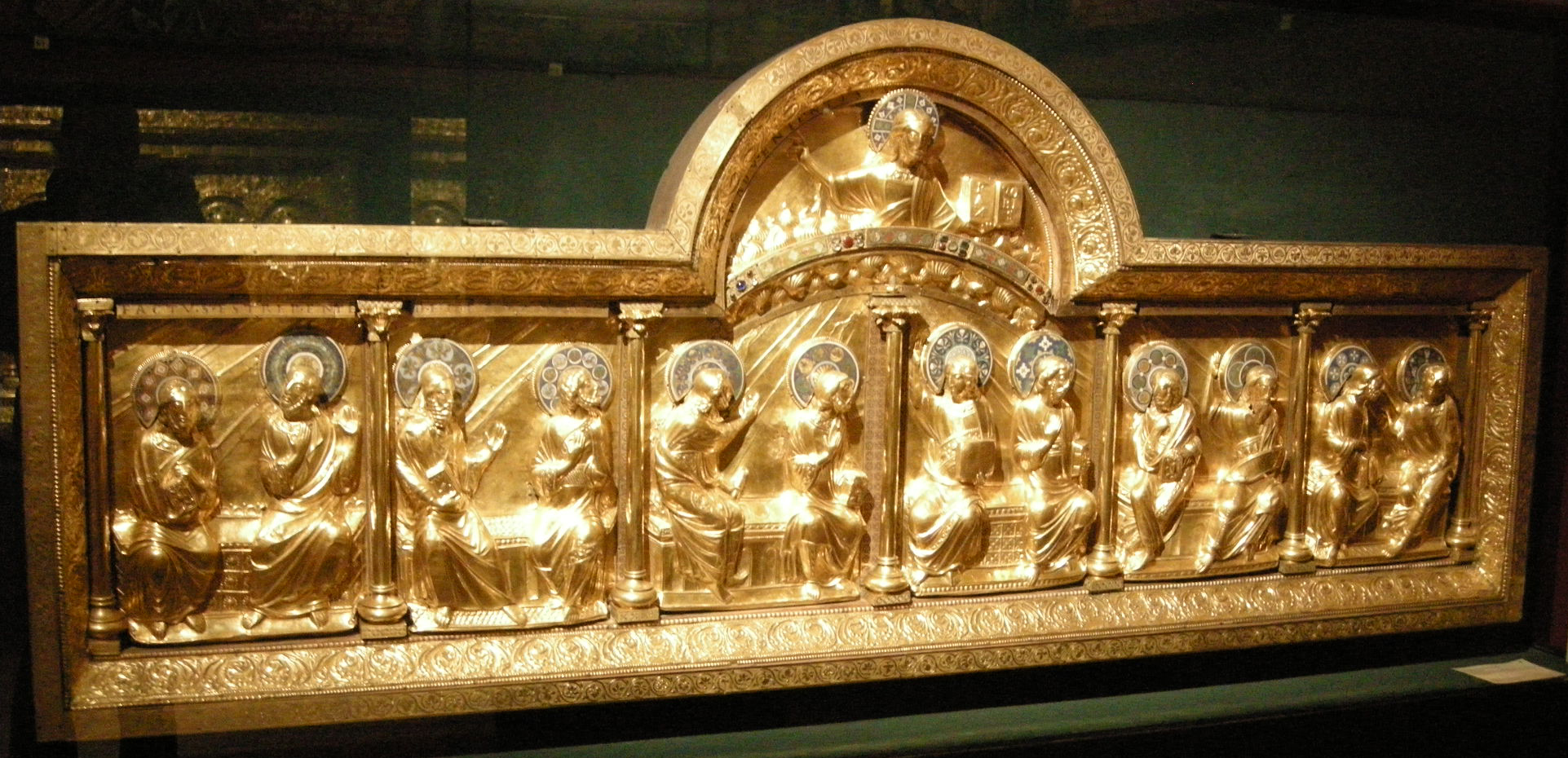
Retable with the Pentecost from Stavelot, c. 1170

== Coat of arms ==
The coat of arms granted to the town of Stavelot, in 1819, is also that of the abbey—parted fesswise between an image of St Remaclus and the wolf, which in Stavelot's founding legend carried bricks for the building of the abbey after having killed Remaclus's donkey.

== Abbots and Prince-Abbots ==
- Remaclus c. 637–652
- Papolinus I, 652–c. 660
- Sigolinus c. 660–c. 666
- Godwin c. 666–c. 675
- Papolinus II, c. 675–?
- Rabangar I, c. 710
- Abolinus
- Crodmarus (Chrodomar)
- Amalgerus
- Aminger (or Floribertus)
- Anglinus 727–746
- Agilulf 746–750
- Alberic 750–779
- Sighard 779–791
- Witand 791–815
- Absalon of Stavelot 815–816
- Ando 816–836
- Ratold 836–840
- Harond 840–844
- Ebbo I 844–845
- Ebbo II 845–867
- Hartgar 867–880
- Adelhard I 880–890
- Linfried 890–898
- Richar 898–905
- Raginer 905–913
- Eberhard 913–?
- Giselbert ?–939
- Conrad I 939–952
- Odilo 952–954
- Werinfried 954–986
- Rabangar II 986–1008
- Bertram 1008–1020
- Poppo I 1020–1048
- Theodoric 1048–1080
- Rudolf of Stavelot 1080–1097
- Volmar 1097–1105
- Poppo II of Beaumont 1105–1119
- Conrad II of Stavelot 1119–1128
- John I de Reulant 1128–1130
- Wibald 1130–1158
- Eriebald 1158–1193
- Gerard I of Vianden 1193–1209
- Adelhard II 1209–1222
- Frederick von dem Stein 1222–1244
- Nicholas I of Stavelot 1244–1248
- Henry I 1248–1274
- John II of Enghien 1274–1281
- Egidius of Falkenstein 1281–1307
- Henry II of Bolanden 1307–1334
- Winrich de Pomerio 1334–1343
- Hugh of Auvergne 1343–1373
- Werner de Ockiers 1373–1393
- Walram of Schleiden 1393–1410
- Henry III de Visé 1410–1417
- John III de Guezaine 1417–1438
- Henry IV of Merode 1438–1460
- Caspar Poncin 1460–1499
- William I of Manderscheid-Kail 1499–1546
- Christopher of Manderscheid-Kail 1546–1576
- Personal union with the Prince-Bishopric of Liège 1576–1650
  - Gerard of Groesbeek 1576–1580
  - Ernest of Bavaria 1581–1612
  - Ferdinand of Bavaria 1612–1650
- William II of Bavaria 1650–1657
- Maximilian Henry of Bavaria 1657
- Franz I Egon of Fürstenberg 1657–1682
- Wilhelm III Egon of Fürstenberg 1682–1704
- Francis II Joseph of Lorraine 1704–1715
- John IV Ernst of Löwenstein-Rochefort 1715–1731
- Nicholas II Massin 1731–1737
- Deodatus Drion 1737–1741
- Joseph de Nollet-Bourdon 1741–1753
- Alexander Delmonte 1753–1766
- Jacobus de Hubin 1766–1786
- Celestine Thys 1786–1794

== See also ==
- List of Carolingian monasteries
- Carolingian architecture
