= Ourthe (department) =

Former French department (1795–1814)

Department of Ourthe Département de l'Ourthe (French) Departement Ourte (Dutch) Departement der Urt (German)
- 1795–1814
- Location of Ourthe in France (1812)
- Status: Department of the French First Republic and the French First Empire
- Chef-lieu: Liège; 50°27′N 3°57′E
- Official languages: French
- Common languages: Dutch, German
- History
  - Creation: 1 October 1795
  - Treaty of Paris, disestablished: 30 May 1814

Population
  - 1796: 325,278
  - 1800: 327,121
  - 1812: 352,264
Preceded by
Austrian Netherlands
Prince-Bishopric of Liège
Princely Abbey of Stavelot-Malmedy
Succeeded by
Liège Province
- Today part of: Belgium; Germany

Ourthe (French pronunciation: [uʁt]; Dutch: Ourte; German: Urt) was a department of the French First Republic and French First Empire in present-day Belgium and Germany. It was named after the river Ourthe (Oûte). Its territory corresponded more or less with that of the present-day Belgian province of Liège and a small adjacent region in North Rhine-Westphalia in Germany. It was created on 1 October 1795, when the Austrian Netherlands and the Prince-Bishopric of Liège were officially annexed by the French Republic. Before this annexation, the territory included in the department had lain partly in the Prince-Bishopric of Liège, the Abbacy of Stavelot-Malmedy, the Duchies of Limburg and Luxembourg, and the County of Namur.

After Napoleon was defeated in 1814, most of the department became part of the United Kingdom of the Netherlands as the province of Liège. The easternmost part (Eupen, Malmedy, Sankt Vith, Kronenburg, Schleiden) became part of the Prussian Rhine Province; part of this (Eupen, Malmedy and Sankt Vith) was taken back into Liège province after the First World War, under the Treaty of Versailles.

== Administration ==
Ourthe within the northern French Empire (1811)

Administrative divisions

The Chef-lieu of the department was Liège. The department was subdivided into the following three arrondissements and cantons:

- Liège: Dalhem, Fléron, Glons, Herve, Hollogne-aux-Pierres, Liège (4 cantons), Louveigné, Seraing and Waremme.
- Huy: Avennes, Bodegnée, Ferrières, Héron, Huy, Landen and Nandrin.
- Malmedy: Aubel, Néau, Kronenbourg, Limbourg, Malmedy, Saint Vith, Schleiden, Spa, Stavelot, Verviers and Vielsalm.

=== Prefects ===
The Prefect was the highest state representative in the department.

Term start	Term end	Office holder
2 March 1800	17 April 1806	Antoine François Ehrard Marie Catherine Desmousseaux de Givre
17 April 1806	30 May 1814	Charles Emmanuel Micoud d'Umons

=== Secretaries-General ===
The Secretary-General was the deputy to the Prefect.

Term start	Term end	Office holder
2 March 1800	?? ?? 1806	Rémy Victor Gaillard
?? ?? 1806	?? ?? 1809	Aubert
?? ?? 1809	?? ?? 1811	Caselli
?? ?? 1811	30 May 1814	Georges Bénigne Liegeard

=== Subprefects of Huy ===
Term start	Term end	Office holder
11 May 1800	5 August 1810	Robinot-Varin
5 August 1810	30 May 1814	Collomb d’Arcine

=== Subprefects of Liège ===
The office of Subprefect of Liège was held by the Prefect until 1811.

Term start	Term end	Office holder
11 January 1811	30 May 1814	Charles Bouziès de Rouvroy

=== Subprefects of Malmedy ===
Term start	Term end	Office holder
25 April 1800	3 February 1804	Jean Thomas Lambert Bassenge
3 February 1804	30 May 1814	Taillevis de Périgny
