= List of protected heritage sites in Hamoir =

This table shows an overview of the protected heritage sites in the Walloon town Hamoir. This list is part of Belgium's national heritage.

Object	Year/architect	Town/section	Address	Coordinates	Number^{?}	Image
Stations of the Cross location with two linden trees called "Es Thier" ^{(nl)} ^{(fr)}		Hamoir	Hamoir	50.428930°N 5.528359°E	61024-CLT-0002-01	
Senny house ^{(nl)} ^{(fr)}		Hamoir	place du Tilleul n°95, Filot	50.426535°N 5.566984°E	61024-CLT-0003-01	Huis Senny
Church of Saint Peter, Xhignesse ^{(nl)} ^{(fr)}		Hamoir	Hamoir	50.436456°N 5.543487°E	61024-CLT-0004-01	Kerk Saint-Pierre de Xhignesse
Wooden mechanics, wheel and surrounding area of Bloquay mill ^{(nl)} ^{(fr)}		Hamoir		50.453809°N 5.528560°E	61024-CLT-0008-01	
Site formed by "Rochers de la Vierge" and "Vallon de Bleron" ^{(nl)} ^{(fr)}		Hamoir		50.444436°N 5.563373°E	61024-CLT-0009-01	Sit van "Rochers de la Vierge" en "Vallon de Bléron"
Lane of chestnut trees ^{(nl)} ^{(fr)}		Hamoir	chemin de Hamoir Lassus, Filot	50.417072°N 5.531424°E	61024-CLT-0010-01	
Church Saint-Pierre de Xhignesse ^{(nl)} ^{(fr)}		Hamoir		50.436456°N 5.543487°E	61024-PEX-0001-01	

== See also ==
- List of protected heritage sites in Liège (province)
- Hamoir
