= Lesene =

Low-relief architectural element

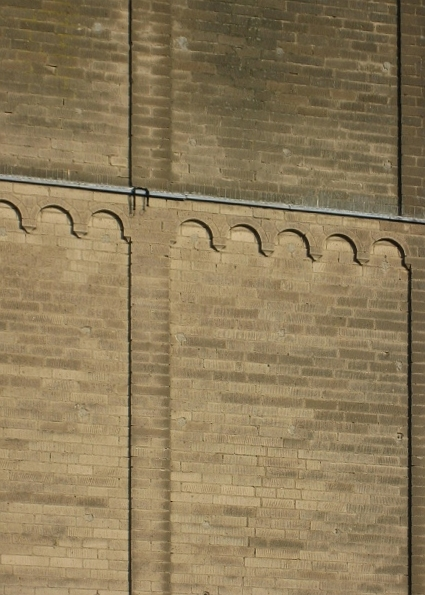
Lesenes and Lombard band (mini-arches), Old St. Martin, Kaarst

A lesene, also called a pilaster strip, is an architectural term for a narrow, low-relief vertical pillar on a wall. It resembles a pilaster, but does not have a base or capital. It is typical in Lombardic and Rijnlandish architectural building styles.

== Function ==
Lesenes are used in architecture to vertically divide a façade or other wall surface optically. However, unlike pilasters, lesenes are simpler, having no bases or capitals. Their function is ornamental, not just to decorate the plain surface of a wall but, in the case of corner lesenes (at the edges of a façade), to emphasise the edges of a building.

== Gallery ==
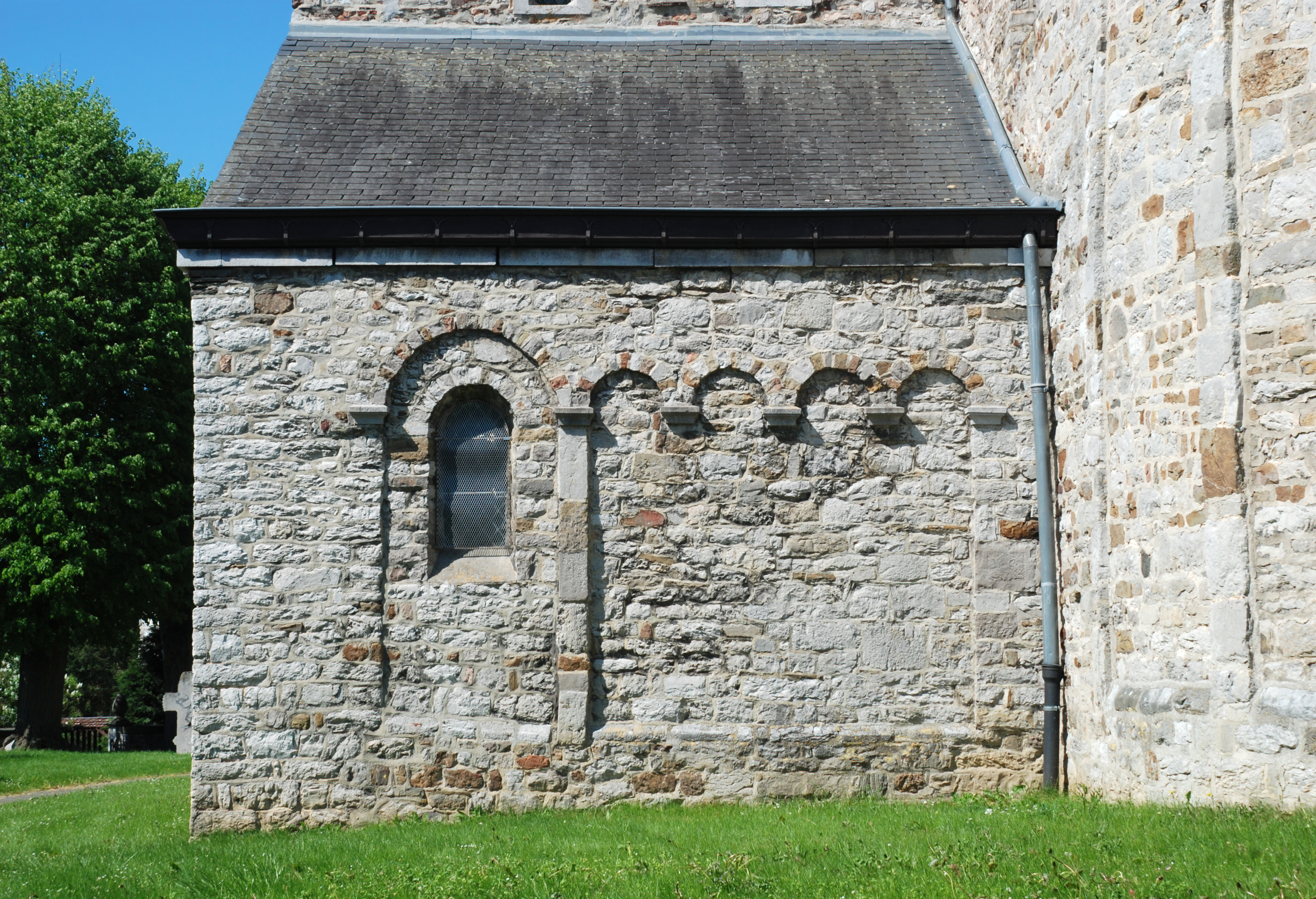
Lesenes and Lombard bands form part of the sparse decoration of the Church of Saint Peter in Xhignesse, Belgium

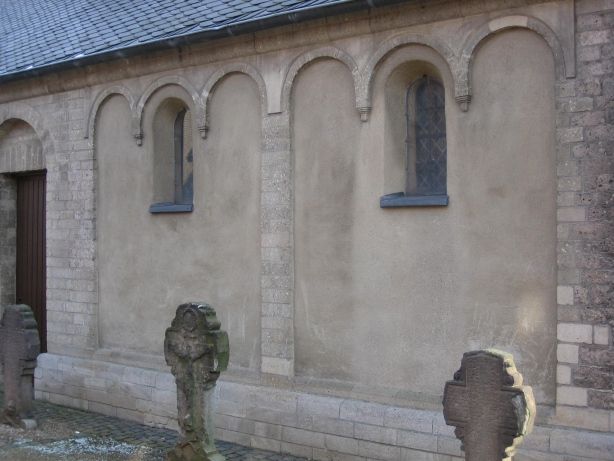
Lesenes and Lombard band (arches) on a chapel

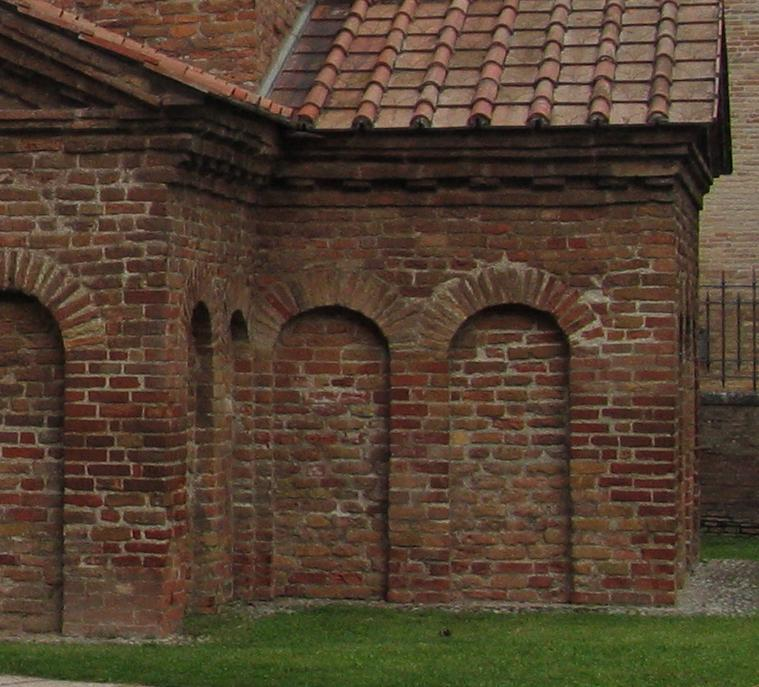
Lesenes forming blind arcades, Mausoleum of Galla Placidia, Ravenna (c. 430); dentils under the eaves.

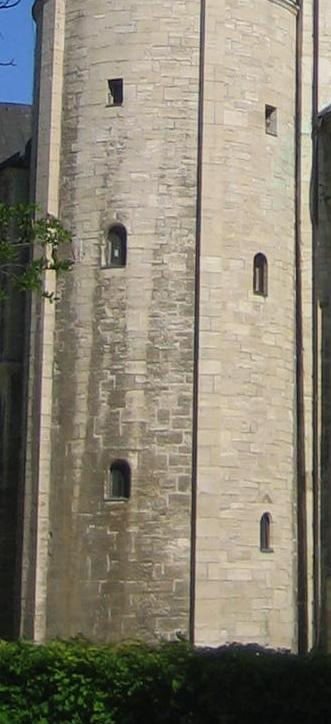
Lesene on the staircase tower, Gernrode collegiate church (pre-1000)

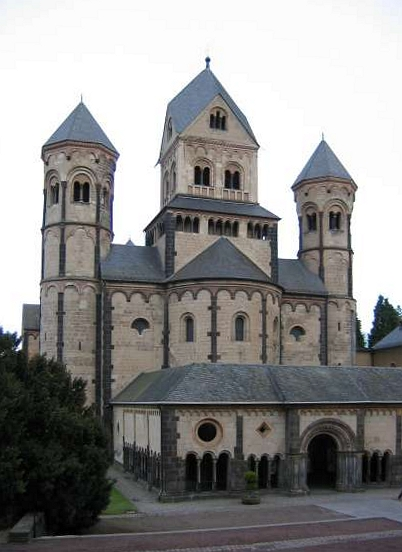
Lesenes on the Maria Laach Abbey (1156)

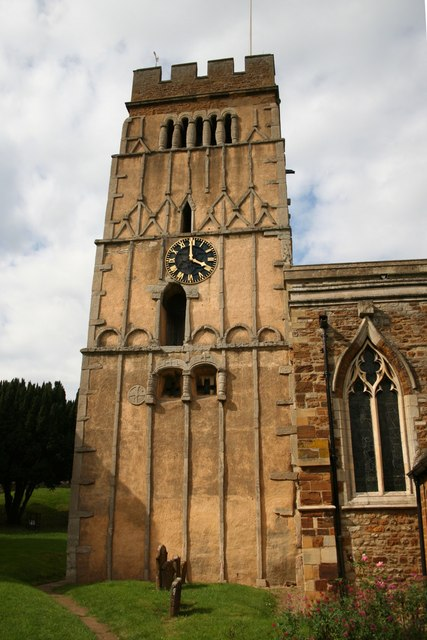
Lesenes on the tower of All Saints' Church, Earls Barton (late 10th century)
Modern and post-modern

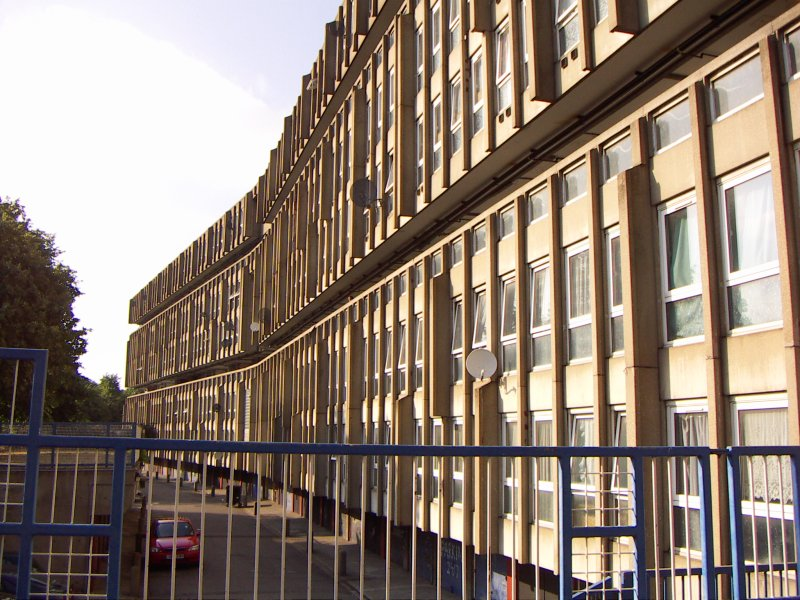
Robin Hood Gardens, London: lesene-shaped formation on the supporting wall in the Plattenbau style

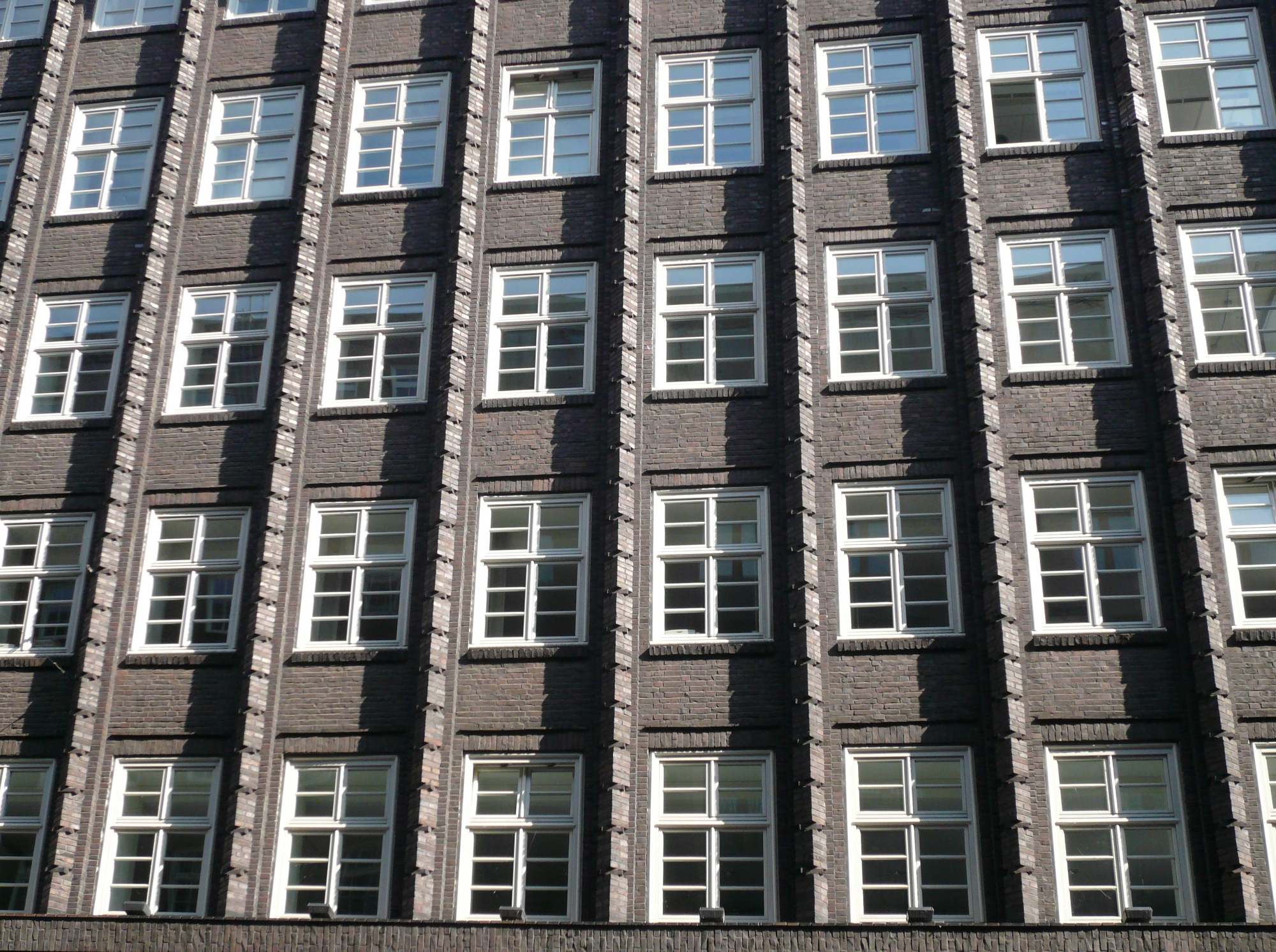
Lesenes at Chile House, Hamburg

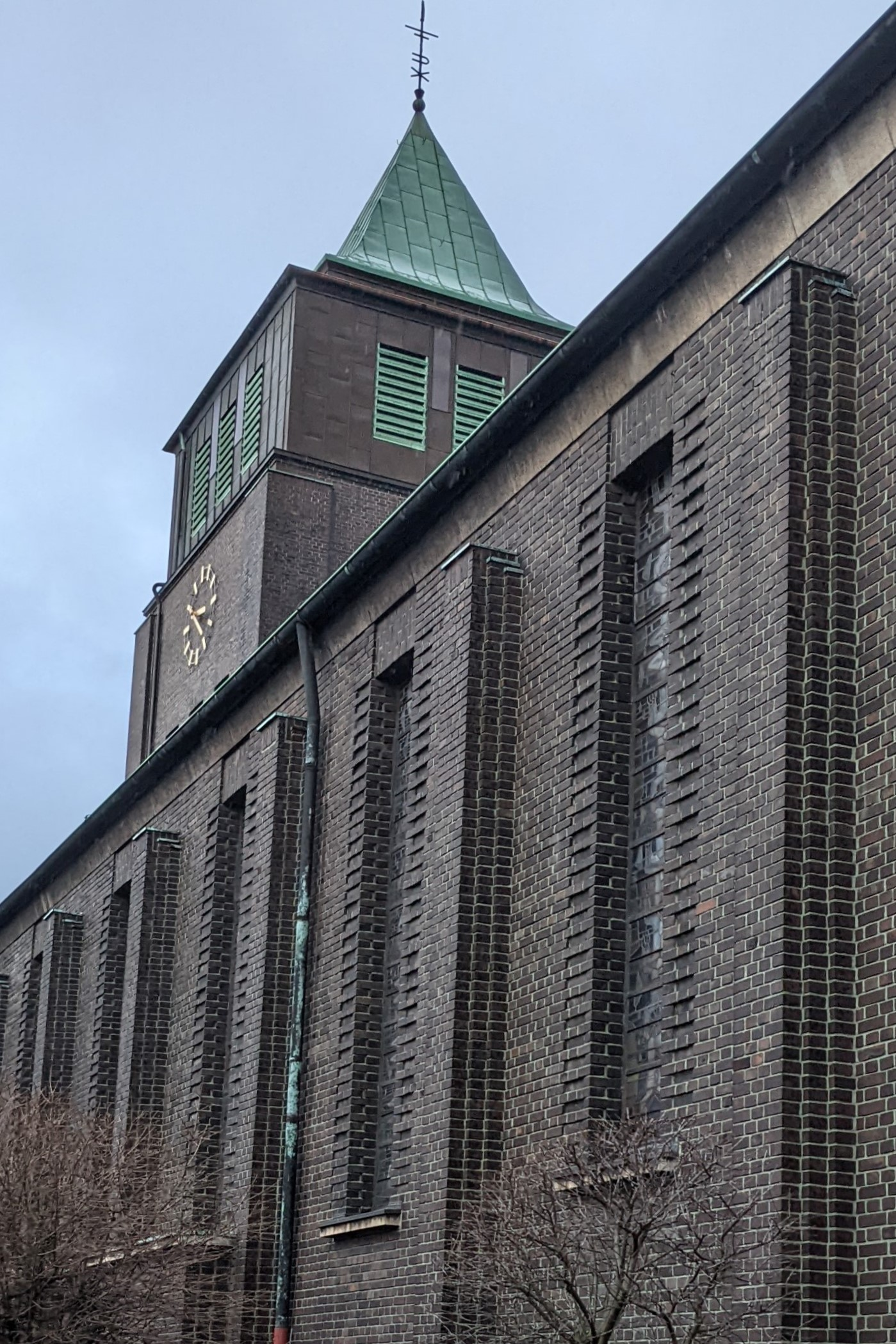
Lesenes on the Ludgerus Church in Bottrop, North Rhine-Westphalia
