= Lassus Castle =

Château in Liège Province, Belgium

Coordinates: 50.419°N 5.521°E

- Château de Lassus (French)
- Hamoir, Liège Province, Wallonia, Belgium
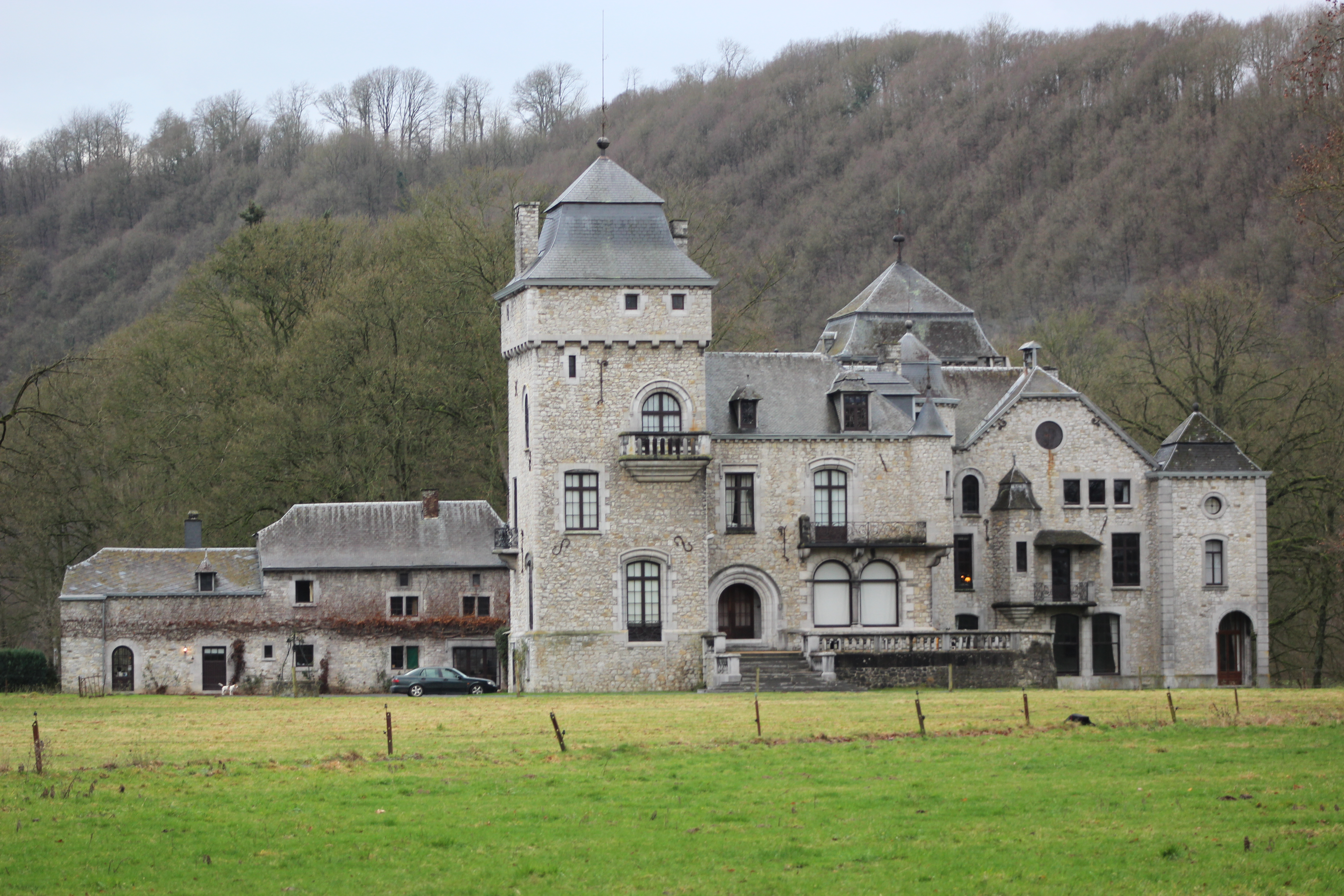
- Lassus Castle

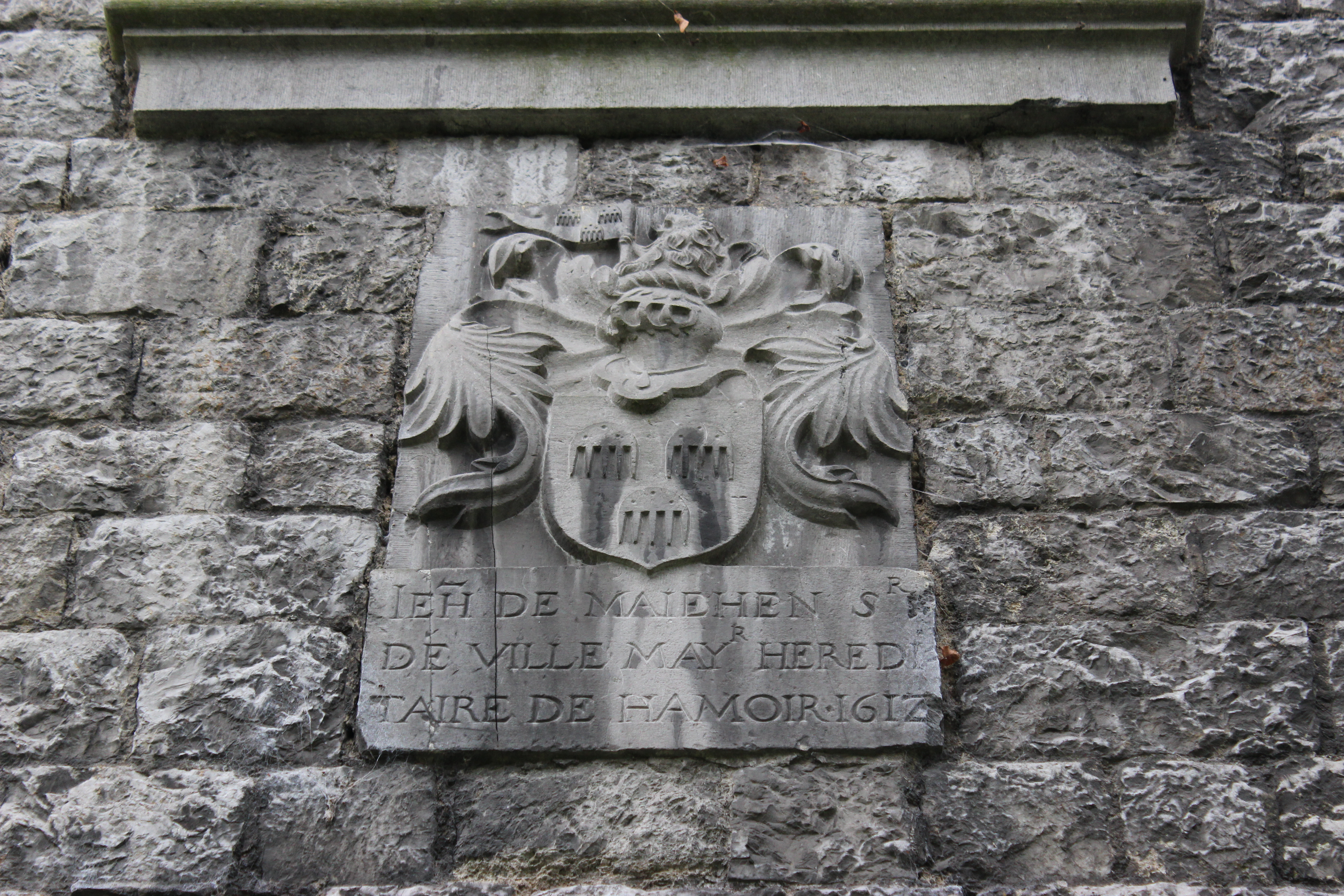
- 1612 stone on Lassus Castle, dedicated to John de Maillen

Site information
- Type: Castle
- Owner: private
- Open to the public: for rental holidays

Lassus Castle (French: Château de Lassus, or Hamoir-Lassus) is a château in Hamoir, Liège Province, Wallonia, Belgium.

The château, which stands on the banks of the Ourthe, was formerly the residence of the hereditary mayors of the village. The oldest part is a small donjon of the early 14th century. Long the property of the de Maillen family, the buildings were entirely remodelled in the 18th century in the Louis XIVth style. Another major remodelling was carried out between 1907 and 1920 under the supervision of then-owner "Puck" Chaudoir, a wealthy banker from Liège.

Of the important outbuildings and supporting structures of the medieval and 18th century phases there now remain only the stables and barns surrounding a courtyard. The least modernised parts of the principal building are the river frontage and the donjon.

As well as a small internal chapel set up in 1633 by the de Maillen family, there is a chapel dedicated to Saint Peter opposite the castle, founded in 1396. The Renaissance interior contains tombstones of the de Donéa and de Maillen families.

== See also ==
- List of castles in Belgium
