= Anglinus =

Anglinus or Anglin, sometimes also referred to as Saint Anglin, (died 746) was an abbot of Stavelot Abbey.

According to documents from Stavelot Abbey, Anglinus was abbot for 44 years; however, according to documents preserved in Liège, his tenure was 22 years. He was a councillor to Plectrude, the wife of Pepin of Herstal (the de facto ruler of Francia). He built a church on land granted by her in Xhignesse, the precursor of today's Church of Saint Peter, and was supposedly buried there. Anglinus also worked to restore discipline in Stavelot Abbey, and trained a new generation of disciples, including Agilulfus of Cologne. At the same time, he was the first abbot not to carry the double title of bishop-abbot (though it remains unclear what this double title actually implied). A document dated 15 August 747 records that the holdings of Lierneux were handed back to Stavelot Abbey by Carloman I during the abbacy of Anglinus.
