= Poppo of Stavelot =

Flemish saint, pilgrim, abbot, and monk

Saint Poppo of Stavelot
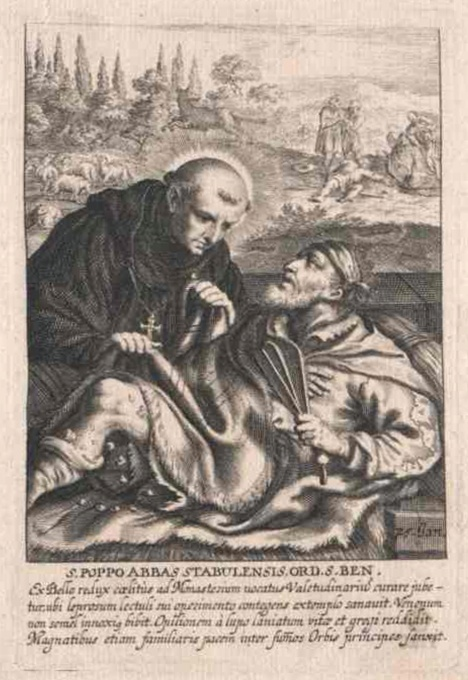

Abbot of Stavelot-Malmedy
- Born: 977; Deinze, now in Belgium
- Died: 25 January 1048; Marchiennes, now in France
- Venerated in: Orthodox Church; Roman Catholic Church
- Major shrine: Stavelot
- Feast: 25 January

Saint Poppo (Deinze, 977 – Marchiennes, 25 January 1048) was a knight of noble descent who turned to a monastic life after experiencing a spiritual conversion. He became one of the best known abbots of Stavelot and was one of the first recorded Flemish pilgrims to the Holy Land. Liturgically, he is commemorated on 25 January.

== Biography ==
The Vita Popponis, the biography of Poppo, was written shortly after his death by the monk Onulf and the abbot Everhelm of the Abbey of Hautmont. According to this source, Poppo belonged to a noble family of Flanders; his parents being Tizekinus and Adalwif. Around the year 1000, he made a pilgrimage to the Holy Land with two companions. Soon after this he also went to Rome. He was about to marry a lady of noble family, when a flame suddenly burst out of the sky late at night and kept his lance radiating. Poppo believed this to be an illumination of the Holy Spirit, and soon after, he decided to enter the monastery of Saint Thierry at Rheims in 1005.

Around 1008, Abbot Richard of Saint Vannes at Verdun, a reformer of monasteries, took Poppo to his monastery. Richard made Poppo prior of St. Vaast in Arras, in the Diocese of Cambrai, at around 1013. This job consisted of reclaiming the monastery's lands from vassals and securing the possession of the monastery by deeds. Sometime before 1016, he was appointed to the same position at Vasloges (Beloacum, Beaulieu) in the Diocese of Verdun.

In 1020, the German emperor Henry II appointed Poppo Abbot of the Abbeys of Stavelot and Malmedy (in Lower Lorraine, now Belgium). In 1023, Poppo also received the Abbey of St. Maximin at Trier.

Poppo became even more important during the reign of Conrad II. From St. Maximin, the Cluniac reform now found its way into the German monasteries. The emperor placed several imperial monasteries under Poppo's control or supervision, such as Limburg an der Hardt, Echternach, St. Gislen, Weissenburg, St. Gall, Hersfeld, Waulsort, Hautmont and Hastières. Soon after Poppo transferred these positions to his pupils and family members, the bishops and laymen who had founded these monasteries placed a series of other monasteries under his care, including St. Laurence at Liège, St. Vincent at Metz, St. Eucharius at Trier, Hohorst, Brauweiler, St. Vaast and Marchiennes. However, the reform of Richard of Saint-Vanne had no permanent success in the German Empire.

Poppo practiced the most severe asceticism. He had no interest in literary affairs, lacked management capacities, and was not prominent in politics. During the reign of Henry III he lost influence. Poppo died while staying at the Abbey of Marchiennes and was buried in the Abbey of Stavelot.
