= Church of Saint Peter, Xhignesse =

Church in Xhignesse, Belgium

Coordinates: 50°26′11″N 05°32′36″E

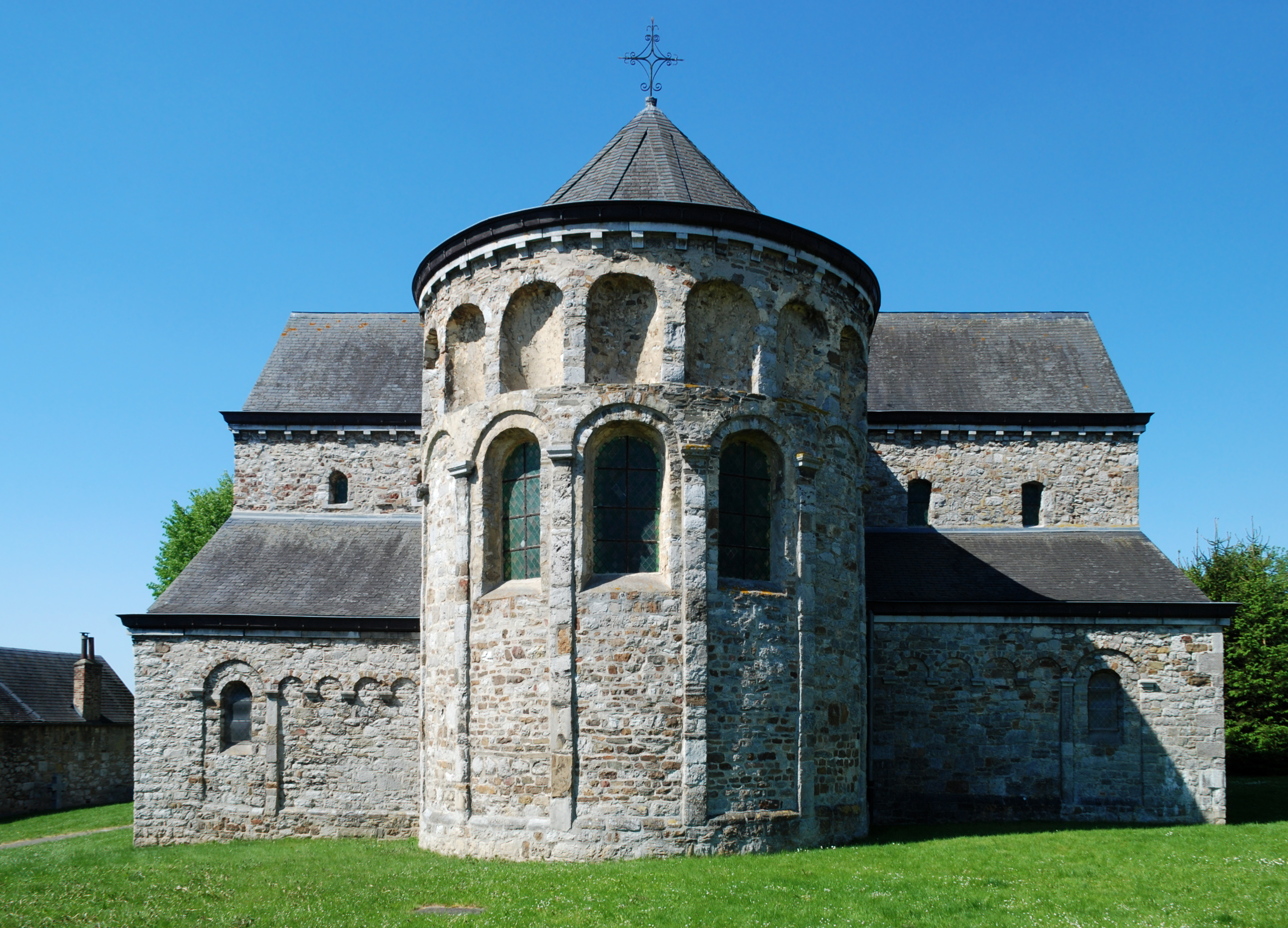
The Church of Saint Peter in Xhignesse, view of the eastern part of the church with the apse.

The Church of Saint Peter (French: Église Saint-Pierre) is a former parish church in Xhignesse, a village in the Belgian municipality of Hamoir. Tradition holds that the first church on the site was founded by Plectrude, the wife of Pepin of Herstal (the de facto ruler of Francia) in the late 7th or early 8th century. The presently visible church dates from the 12th century. The quality of its construction is unusually high, and its scale and layout is uncommon and largely unexplained. It is today a protected heritage site.

== History ==
Tradition holds that a church was founded in Xhignesse by Plectrude, the wife of Pepin of Herstal (the de facto ruler of Francia) in the late 7th or early 8th century. It was established on an estate that had been gifted to the Princely Abbey of Stavelot-Malmedy, and probably served a religious community, rather than as a parish church. It contained the tomb of one of the abbots of Stavelot, Saint Anglin. The original church is said to have been burnt down by Viking raiders in the 9th century. The history of the presently visible church is opaque, but it was built around 1100, or possibly towards the end of the 12th century. Since 1812, it has served as a chapel within the parish of Hamoir. Some intrusive restoration work was made in modern times, somewhat altering the original appearance of the church. The church is a protected heritage site.

== Description ==
View of the church from the south-west, with its entrance and within its setting in the village of Xhignesse

The church is divided into a short nave and two aisles, leading to a disproportionately large transept and crossing that may have been intended to support a central tower. The chancel is one bay long and ends in a semi-circular apse. On either side of the chancel are enclosed spaces of unclear purpose. The church has a broad western tower, which was repaired and partially rebuilt in 1742.

Exterior decoration is concentrated to the apse and the eastern part of the church. The apse is decorated with an upper row of blind arcades, and below them lesenes flanking the windows extend to the socle of the building. The east-facing walls of the chancel are decorated with Lombard bands. The decoration shows lingering influences from Ottonian architecture in the use of Lombard bands, while the blind arcades are early variants of a decorative scheme that would become prevalent in Romanesque architecture, particularly in the Rhine river area. The quality of the construction of the entire church is uncommonly high for churches of its type and from its time, and the scale and layout is unusual and largely unexplained.

== Sources cited ==
- Barral i Altet, Xavier (1989). Belgique Romane et Grand-Duché de Luxembourg (in French). Zodiaque. ISBN 2-7369-0166-5.
- Leclercq-Marx, Jacqueline (1997). L'art Roman en Belgique (in French). Braine-l'Alleud: J.-M. Collet. OCLC 40595503.
- Menne, Gilbert, ed. (2014). Le grand guide de Wallonie et de Bruxelles (in French). Brussels: Racine. ISBN 978-94-014-1418-0.
