= Filot =

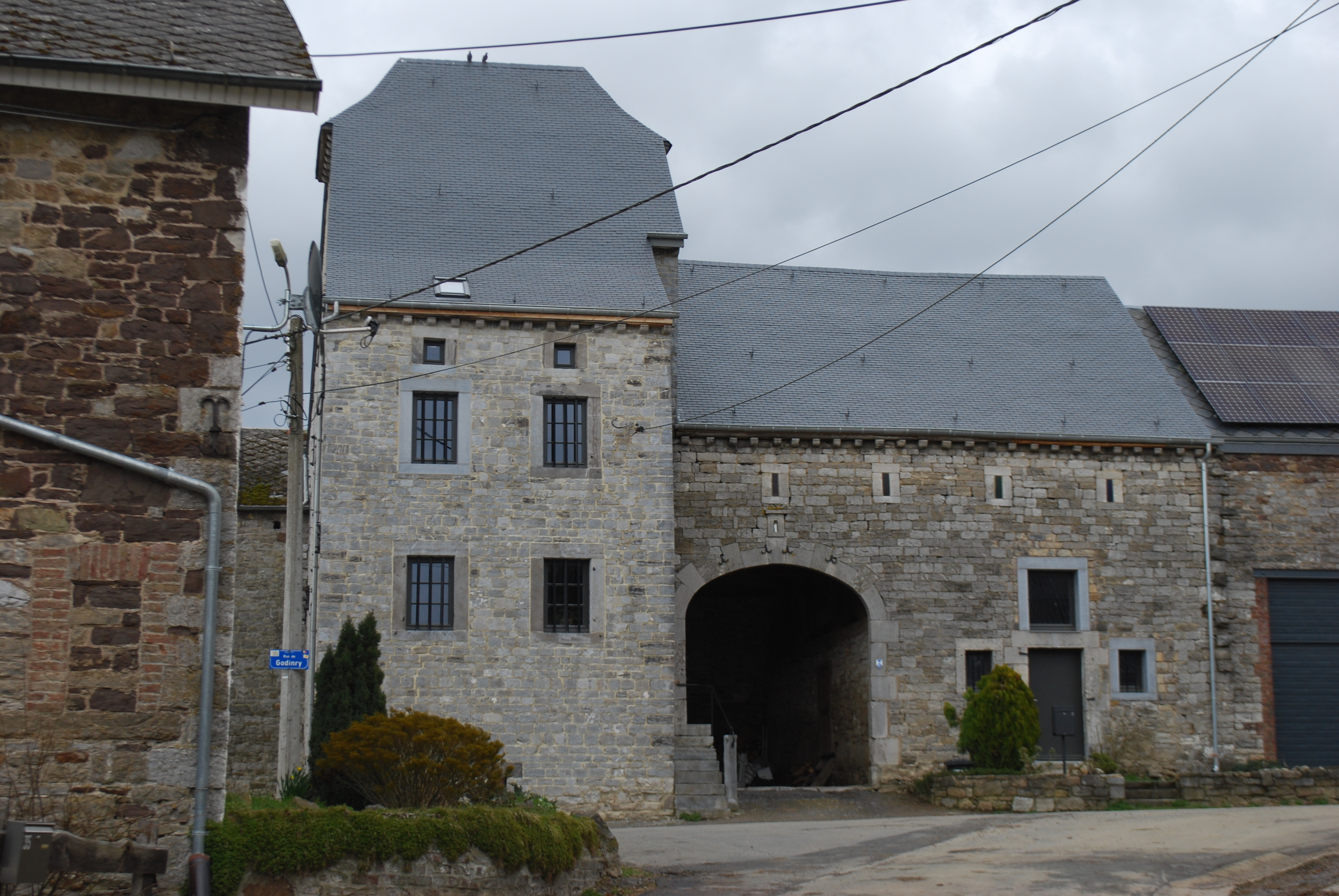
- 18th-century building in Filot

- Location within Belgium Location within Europe
- Coordinates: 50°25′35″N 05°34′00″E
- Country: Belgium
- Region: Wallonia
- Province: Liège
- Municipality: Hamoir

Filot is a village and district of the municipality of Hamoir, located in the province of Liège in Wallonia, Belgium.

The village was part of the Comté de Logne from 895 until the French Revolution in 1789. The village church dates from 1531, and was rebuilt in 1648. The village also contains some historical residential houses. In 1914, during World War I, German troops were lodged in the village.

== Notable residents ==
- Édouard Senny (1923–1980), poet and composer, born in Filot
