= Wibald =

Benedictine abbot and advisor to German kings (1098–1158)

Wibald (Latin: Wibaldus; early 1098 – 19 July 1158) was a 12th-century abbot of Stavelot (Stablo) and Malmedy in present-day Belgium, and abbot of Corvey in Germany. He figured prominently in the court circle of the German kings of his time.

== Biography ==
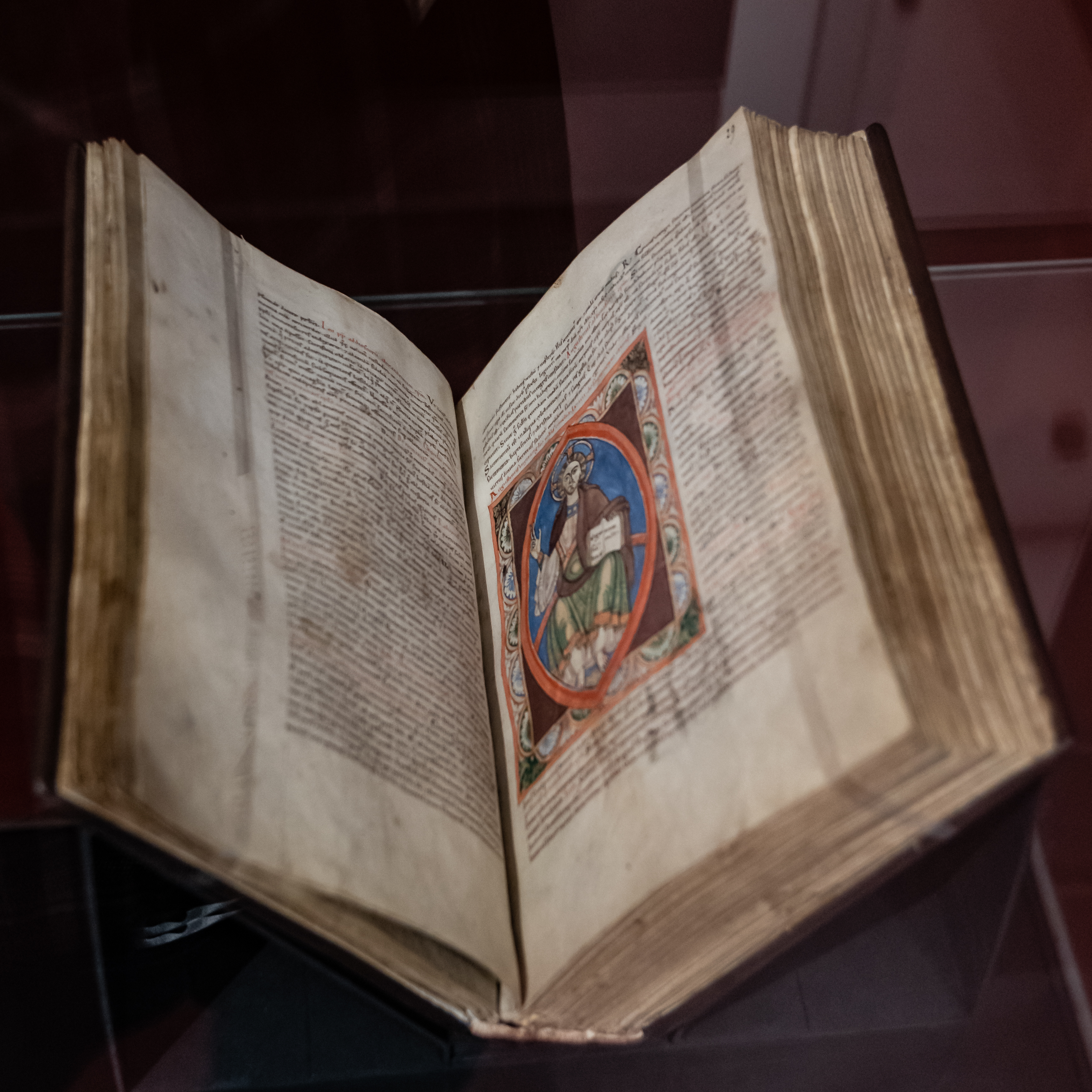
Sacramentary of Wibald

Wibald was born near Stavelot in 1098. Soon after he studied at the monastic schools at Stavelot and the abbey of Saint-Laurent at Liège, where one of his teachers was Rupert of Deutz. He entered the Benedictine monastery at Waulsort near Namur in 1117. After presiding for some time over the monastic school there he went to the monastery at Stavelot and in 1130 was elected Abbot of Stavelot and Malmedy. On 22 October 1146, he was also elected Abbot of Corvey and four months later the convents at Fischbeck and Kemnade were annexed to Corvey by Conrad III. During the abbacy of Wibald, the monastery of Stavelot reached the period of its greatest fame, and at Corvey the monastic discipline which had been on the decline was again restored.

Wibald was one of the most influential councillors of the Holy Roman Emperor Lothaire II and King Conrad III. Combining patriotism with a submissive devotion to the Holy See, he used his great influence to preserve harmony between the emperors and the popes. In 1137 he accompanied Lothair on a military expedition to Italy and through the emperor's influence was elected Abbot of Monte Cassino. When King Roger II of Sicily threatened to destroy the monastery unless Wibald resigned the abbacy, he returned to Stavelot, having been Abbot of Monte Cassino for only forty days.

During the reign of Conrad III (1138–52), Wibald became still more influential. All the emperor's negotiations with the Apostolic See were carried on by Wibald, and he visited Rome on eight occasions on imperial embassies. The emperor would enter upon no political undertaking without consulting the abbot. Hoping to acquire the island of Rügen, he took part in the partly successful 1147 Wendish Crusade. During the absence of Conrad III in Outremer (1147–49), Wibald was the tutor of the king's young son Henry Berengar, but seems to have had little to do with the political affairs of Germany during that period.

Conrad's successor, Frederick I Barbarossa, esteemed Wibald highly and sent the abbot on a mission to Constantinople in 1154 and again in 1157. His sudden death at Bitolia in Paphlagonia in 1158 while returning from the second mission gave rise to the suspicion that he was poisoned by the Byzantines.

== Writings ==
More than 400 of Wibald's epistles are still extant. He himself collected them in the so-called Codex epistolaris Wibaldi. The letters consists primarily of writings about administration and political issues, important to the personnel in the imperial chancery. Beginning with the year 1146, they became a chief source for the history of Conrad III and the early reign of Frederick Barbarossa.
