= Stavelot Bible =

Romanesque illuminated manuscript Bible in two volumes

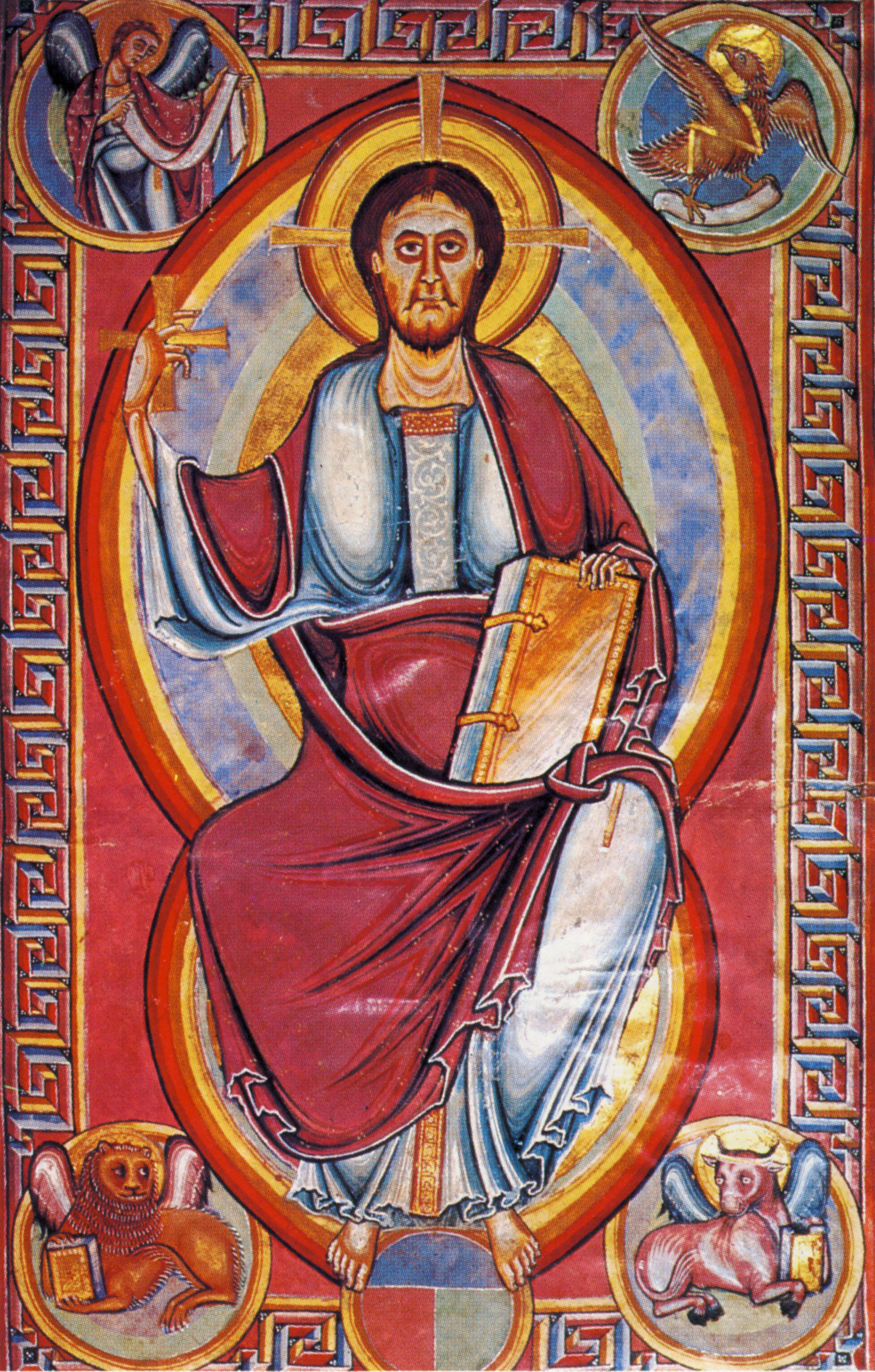
Christ in majesty; a page from the Stavelot Bible.

The Stavelot Bible is a Romanesque illuminated manuscript Bible in two volumes datable to 1093–1097. It was produced for, but not necessarily in, the Benedictine monastery of Stavelot, in the Principality of Stavelot-Malmedy of modern Belgium, and required four years to complete. It was probably the main liturgical Bible of the monastery, kept on the altar of the abbey church or in the sacristy, rather than in the library. It is one of the most important Mosan manuscripts of the last quarter of the 11th century, and shares some of its scribes and artists with the earlier Lobbes Bible and a manuscript of Josephus, in all of which a monk called Goderannus was at least a scribe, and possibly the main artist. For many years it was in the Royal Library at Bamberg, until it was acquired by the British Library in London, where it is catalogued as Add MS 28106-28107. The pages measure 581 x 390 mm, and there are 228 and 240 leaves in the two volumes.

== Authorship ==
Both volumes of the book were written by two Benedictine monks, the calligraphers Brother Ernest (or Ernesto) and Brother Goderannus. Goderannus had the habit, helpful to modern scholars, of adding colophons with some detailed information to his manuscripts. In the Stavelot Bible a colophon records that the work took four years, including the illuminations and what was no doubt a magnificent metalwork treasure binding. The task was finished when "Jerusalem was under attack by many peoples", in other words during the First Crusade. Goderannus had written the Lobbes Bible, which another colophon dates to 1084; at that time he was a monk of Lobbes Abbey, but it is assumed that he had moved to Stavelot in the intervening years, as the Josephus was also made for the abbey there. Many scholars believe that he was also the main artist for the miniatures in both manuscripts, although it is agreed that at least four hands were involved in the miniatures in the Stavelot Bible. In particular, the most famous miniature, the image of Christ in Majesty (shown to the right) was contributed by a different artist, sometimes termed the "Master of the Holy Majesty", who may have been a layman. It has even been suggested that it is a later addition to the manuscript, considering its advanced technique for the time, although most scholars find this theory unlikely, given that other artists of the region were known to demonstrate similar precocity at the time. A number of other miniatures are also attributed to this artist, including the arcades over the canon tables. In general the artists worked roughly on stretches of books in the Biblical sequence, so that, for example, the Pentateuch initials are all by the same hand.

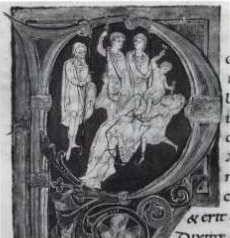
Yael killing Sisera, part of the historiated initial at the start of the Book of Judges.

== Style ==
The Christ in Majesty, which comes at the start of the New Testament, is the only full-page miniature; all others are decorated letters and historiated initials in large narrow panels at the start of the books of the Bible. Several of these show large numbers of small figures in different scenes, in particular the "I" of In principio at the beginning of the Book of Genesis, which takes up the whole height of the page, with a total of 33 small scenes within a geometric framework, ranging from the events of Genesis itself to the Last Judgement. They show varied influences, including a strong stylistic one from Mosan metalwork and enamels. The figure style shows the influences of the German tradition from Ottonian and Carolingian art, as well as Byzantine art, possibly mediated through Italian works. There is decorative influence from the Anglo-Norman Channel School. The miniatures show both the older technique of pen-drawing relatively lightly coloured-in, and the new style, derived from Italy, of fully painted images using opaque colours. The interlace decoration of the Lobbes Bible has been replaced by foliage forms. The decorative scheme of the book is typical of large monastic Bibles, which during the Romanesque period were the most common books to be lavishly illuminated for display, along with the psalter, having taken over this role from the Gospel book. Careful examination of the Greek keyhole pattern surrounding the Christ in Majesty will reveal clusters of triple and five dot pattern in white. The entire scheme is based (at however many removes) on the 5th century mosaic band decorating the arch of the Mausoleum of Galla Placidia, Ravenna.

== See also ==
- Worms Bible
- Parc Abbey Bible
- Floreffe Bible
- Lambeth Bible
- Winchester Bible
