= Louveigné =

Coordinates: 50°32′N 5°42′E

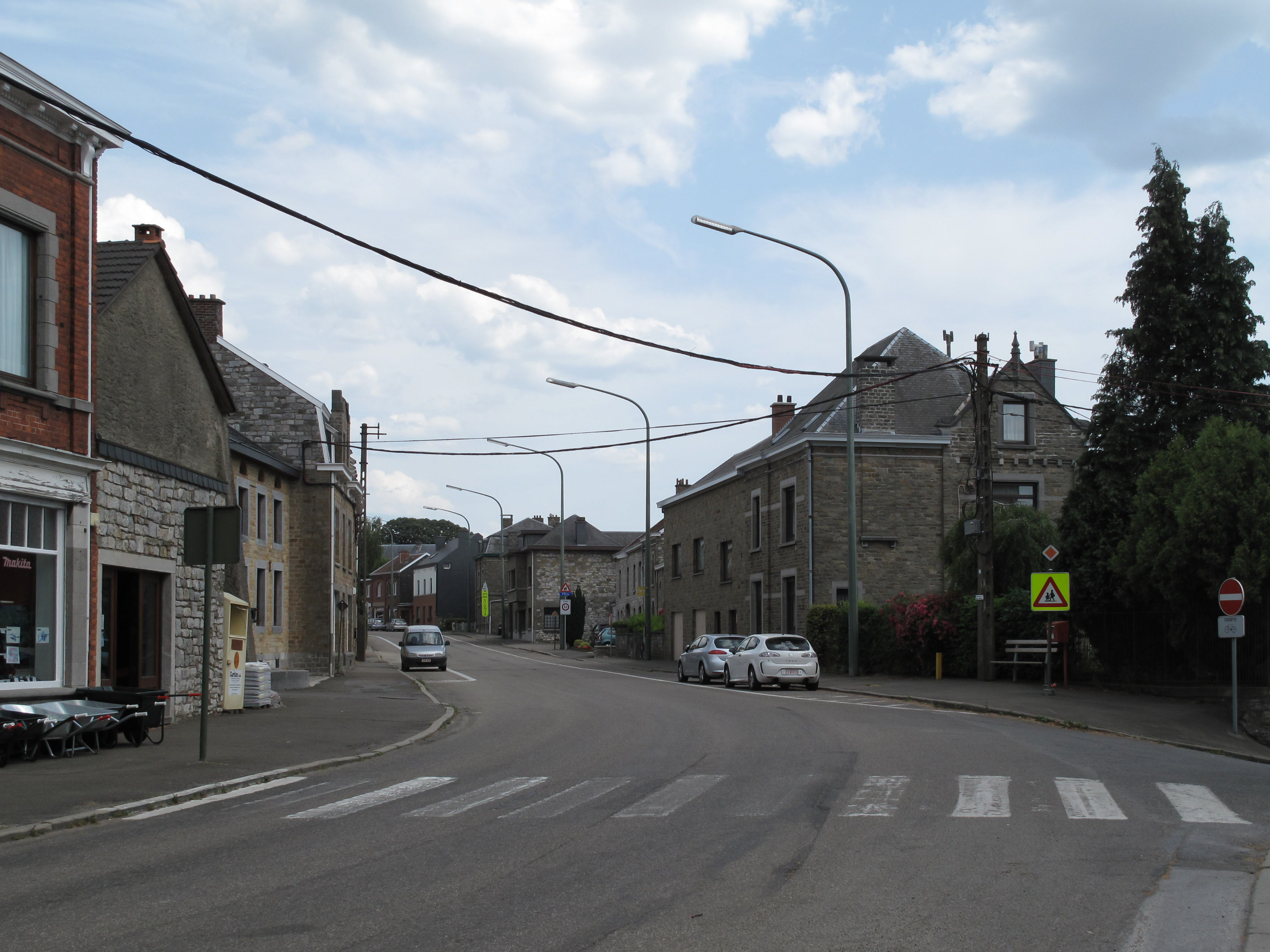
Louveigné

Louveigné (French pronunciation: [luvɲe]; Walloon: Lovgné) is a village of Wallonia and a district of the municipality of Sprimont, located in the province of Liège, Belgium. At the time of the Battle of Liège of World War I, the town was deserted due to the invading German army. During World War II the mayor of Louveigné coordinated a village wide secretive campaign to shelter and hide Jewish children from the Nazis that were then occupying Belgium. Every family in the entire village hid at least one Jewish child during the occupation.

The village of Banneux lies on its territory.
