= Hamoir =

Municipality in Liège Province, Wallonia, Belgium

Hamoir: Hamwer (Walloon)
- Municipality
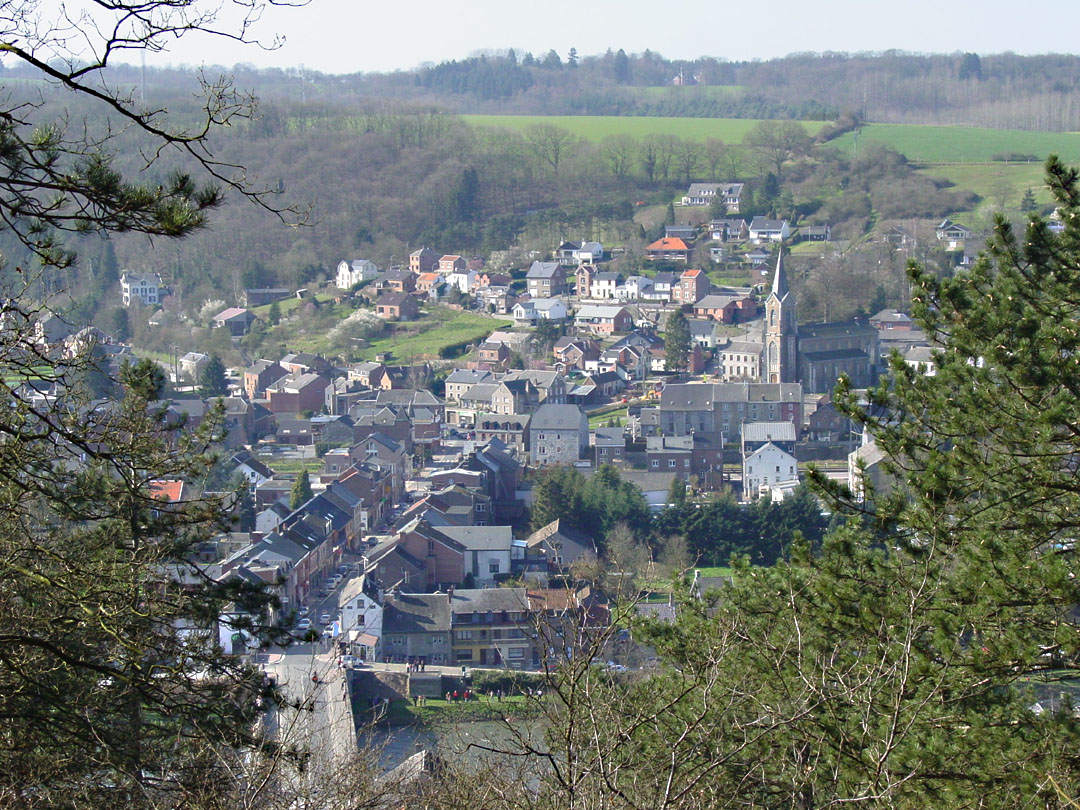
- Looking west over Hamoir from the Belvédère de Coïsse

- Flag Coat of arms

- Location of Hamoir in the province of Liège
- Interactive map of Hamoir
- Location in Belgium
- Coordinates: 50°26′N 05°32′E
- Country: Belgium
- Community: French Community
- Region: Wallonia
- Province: Liège
- Arrondissement: Huy

Government
  - Mayor: Patrick Lecerf (IC)
  - Governing party: IC

Area
  - Total: 27.75 km^{2} (10.71 sq mi)

Population (2018-01-01)
  - Total: 3,872
  - Density: 139.5/km^{2} (361.4/sq mi)
- Postal codes: 4180, 4181
- NIS code: 61024
- Area codes: 04, 086
- Website: www.hamoir.be

Hamoir (French pronunciation: [amwaʁ]; Walloon: Hamwer) is a municipality of Wallonia located in the province of Liège, Belgium.

On 1 January 2006, Hamoir had a total population of 3,592. The total area is 27.80 km^{2} which gives a population density of 129 inhabitants per km^{2}. Hamoir is situated on the river Ourthe.

The municipality consists of the following districts: Comblain-Fairon, Filot, and Hamoir. The village of Xhignesse contains a well-preserved Romanesque church, the Church of Saint Peter, Xhignesse, a protected heritage site.

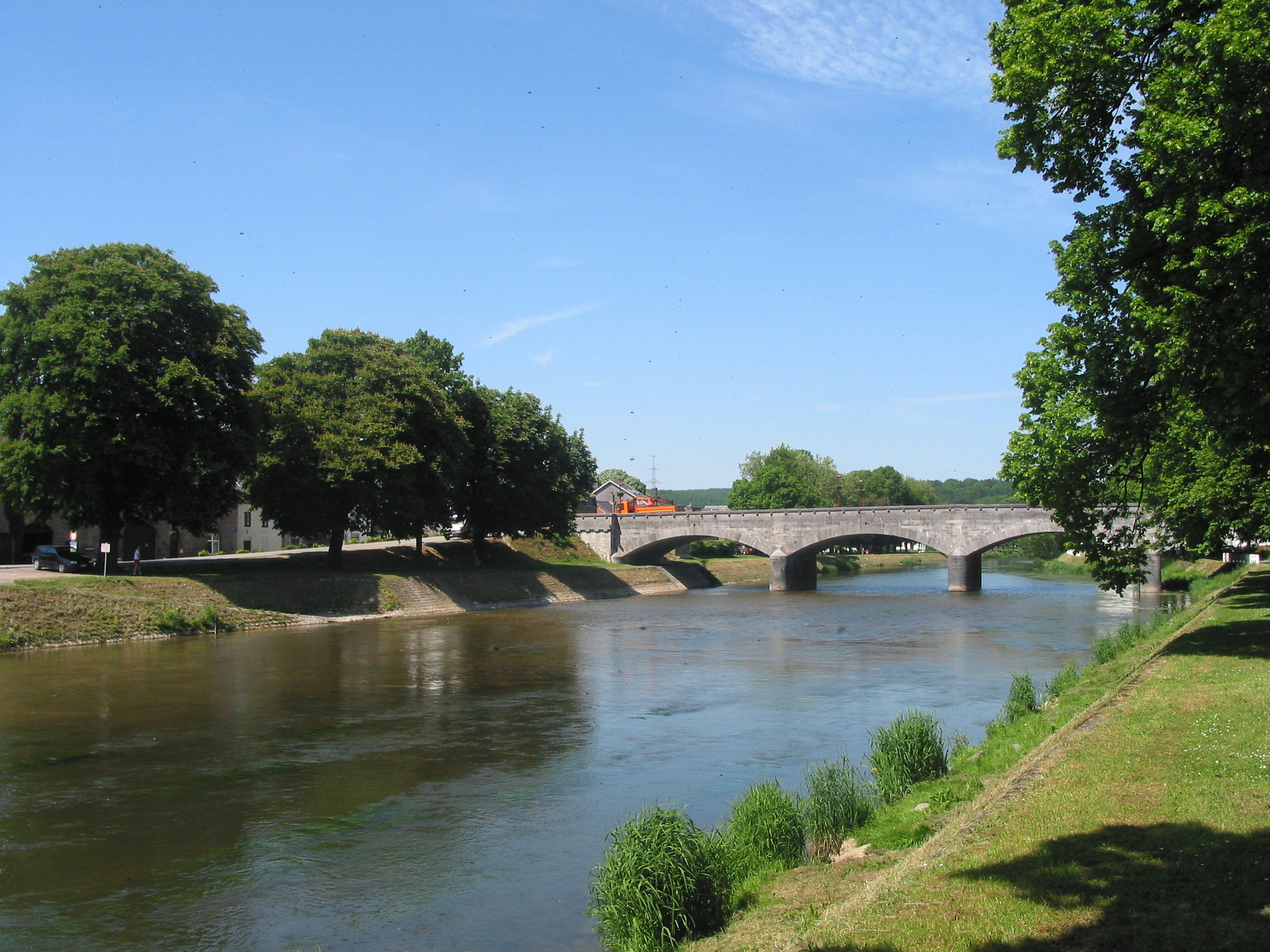
The Ourthe in Hamoir

== See also ==
- List of protected heritage sites in Hamoir
