= Xhignesse =

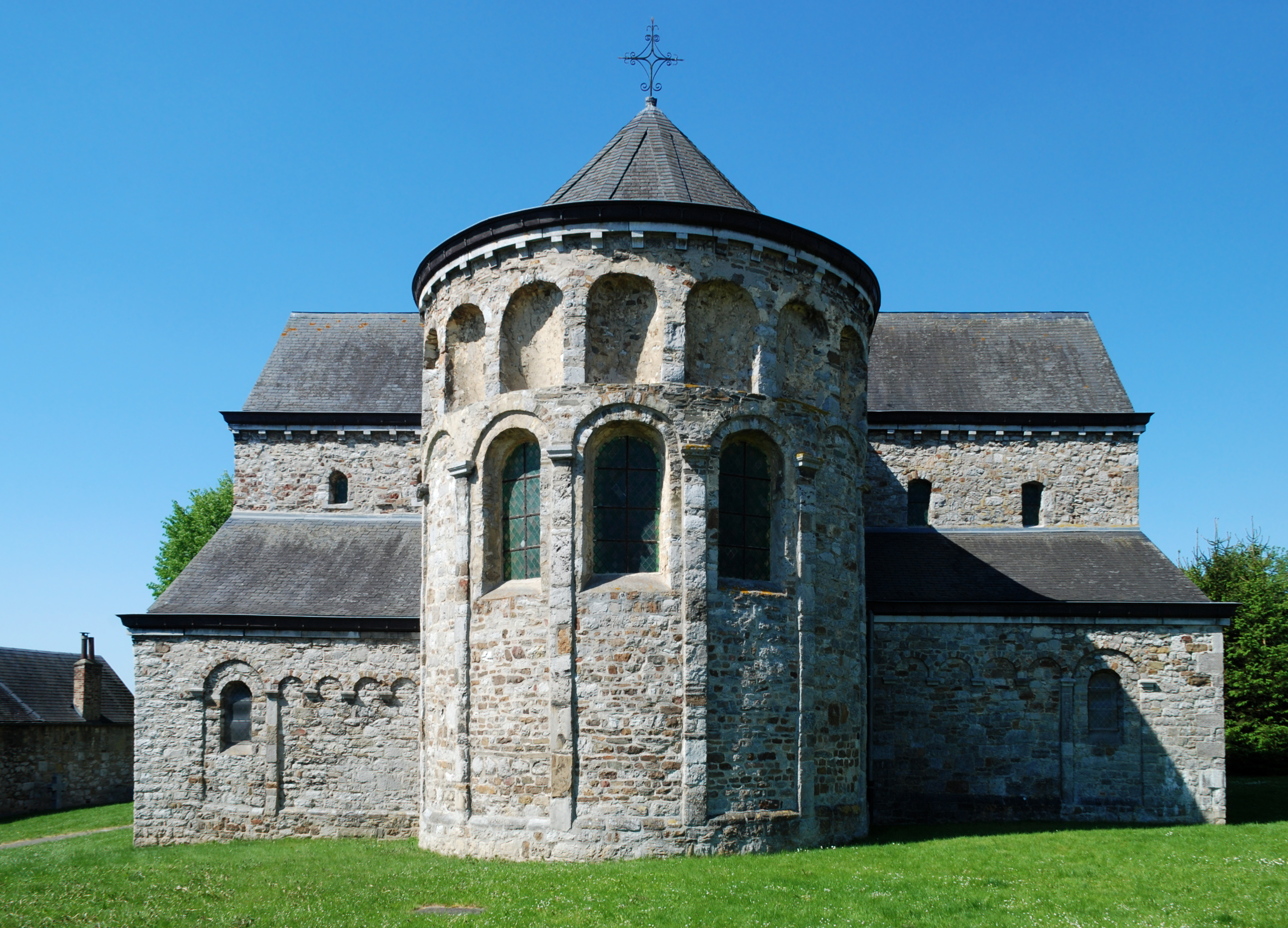
- Church of Saint Peter, Xhignesse

- Location within Belgium Location within Europe
- Coordinates: 50°26′11″N 05°32′38″E
- Country: Belgium
- Region: Wallonia
- Province: Liège
- Municipality: Hamoir

Xhignesse is a village in the municipality of Hamoir, located in the province of Liège in Wallonia, Belgium.

The village contains a well-preserved Romanesque church, the Church of Saint Peter, Xhignesse.
