= Hand of benediction =

Hand injury

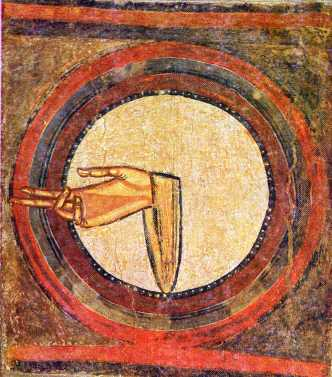
The Hand of God, Fresco from Sant Climent de Taüll, Catalonia, Spain.

The hand of benediction, also known as benediction sign or preacher's hand, has been said to occur as a result of prolonged compression or injury of the median nerve at the forearm or elbow.

More recently it has been shown that the clinical appearance of a high median nerve palsy is different from the classical hand of benediction or preacher's hand posture pointing finger.

== Cause ==
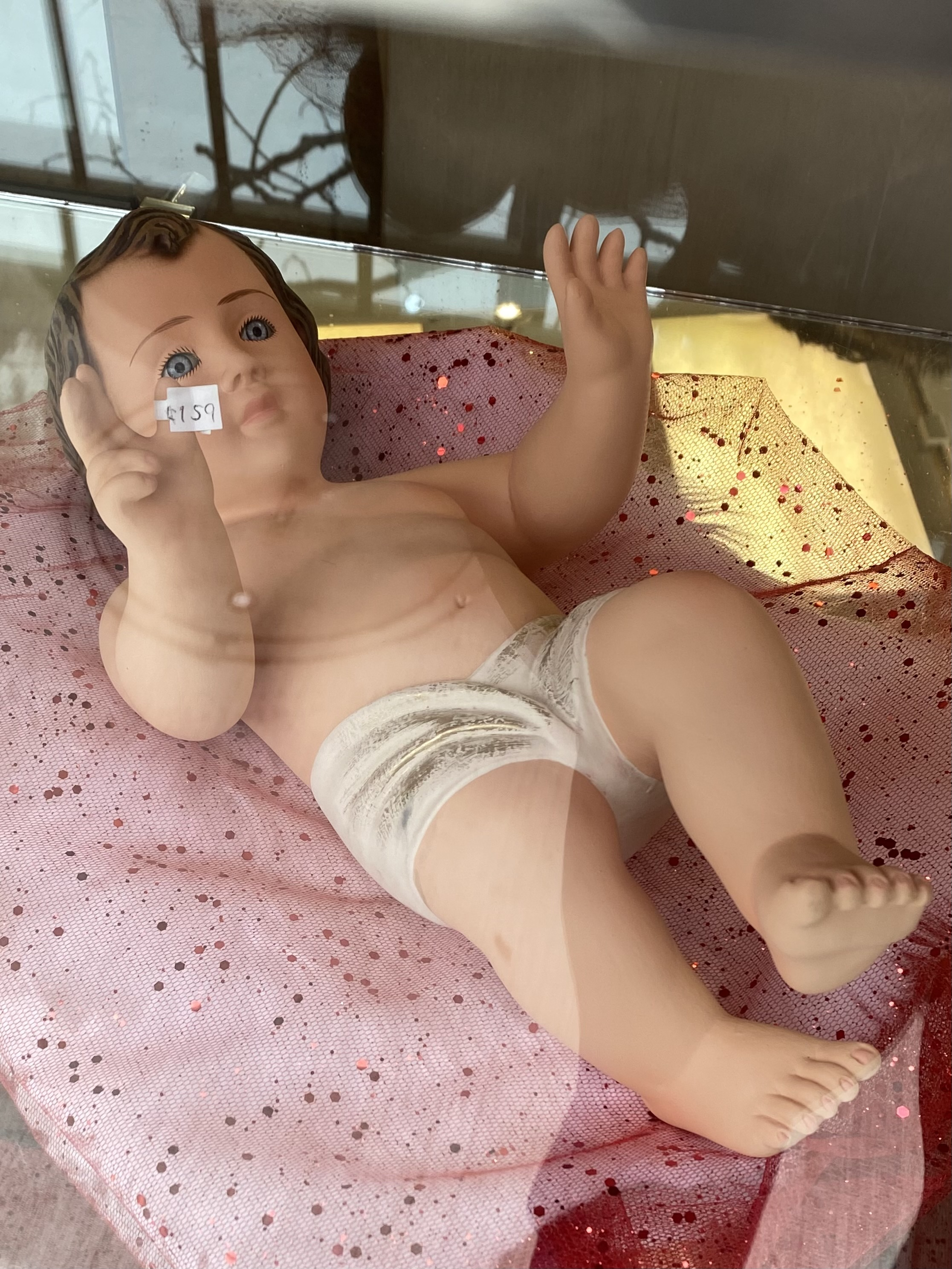
The gesture of benediction displayed on a model of the baby Jesus in a shop window in Little Portugal, Toronto.

The term "hand of benediction" has been used to refer to damage of the median nerve. However, the name is misleading as the patients with this median nerve problem usually can flex all fingers except for the index finger. The index finger is still extended at the metacarpophalangeal joint (MCP joint) when the ulnar nerve innervated muscles (the interossei muscles) are still working. The index finger is not flexed at the proximal interphalangeal (PIP) and distal interphalangeal (DIP) joints, which looks like a pointing finger. Pointing Finger is therefore a much better term to recognize this condition.

The middle finger is flexed because of the connection between the flexor digitorum profundus (FDP) tendons, which is called the Quadriga phenomenon.

== Name ==
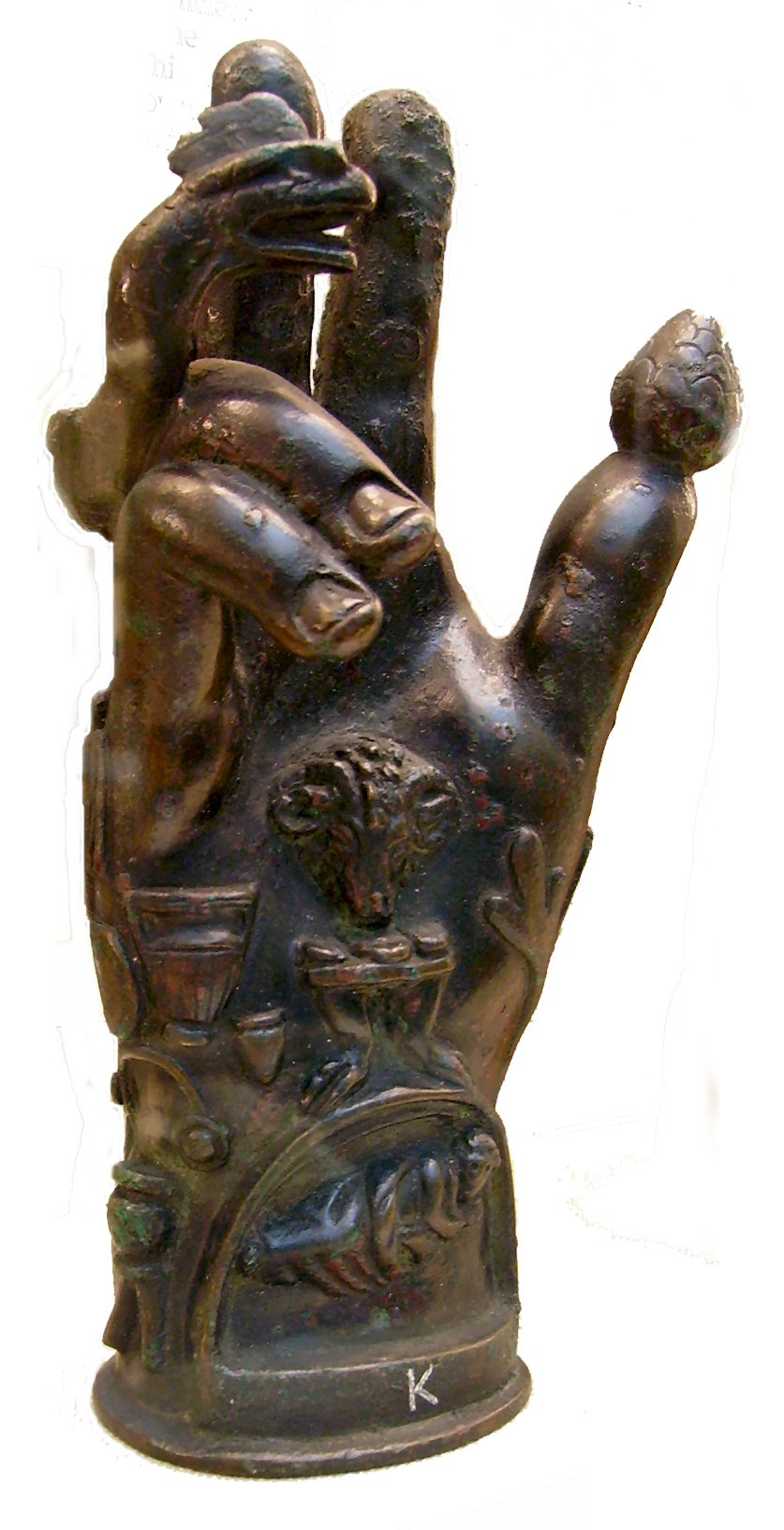
Bronze hand used in the worship of Sabazios, 1st–2nd century CE

The term "hand of benediction" refers to the similarity to a sign commonly used in Catholicism, which is said to originate from Saint Peter. Some sources speculate that Peter himself may have had ulnar nerve entrapment.
