= Master of Taüll =

Romanesque painter from Catalonia

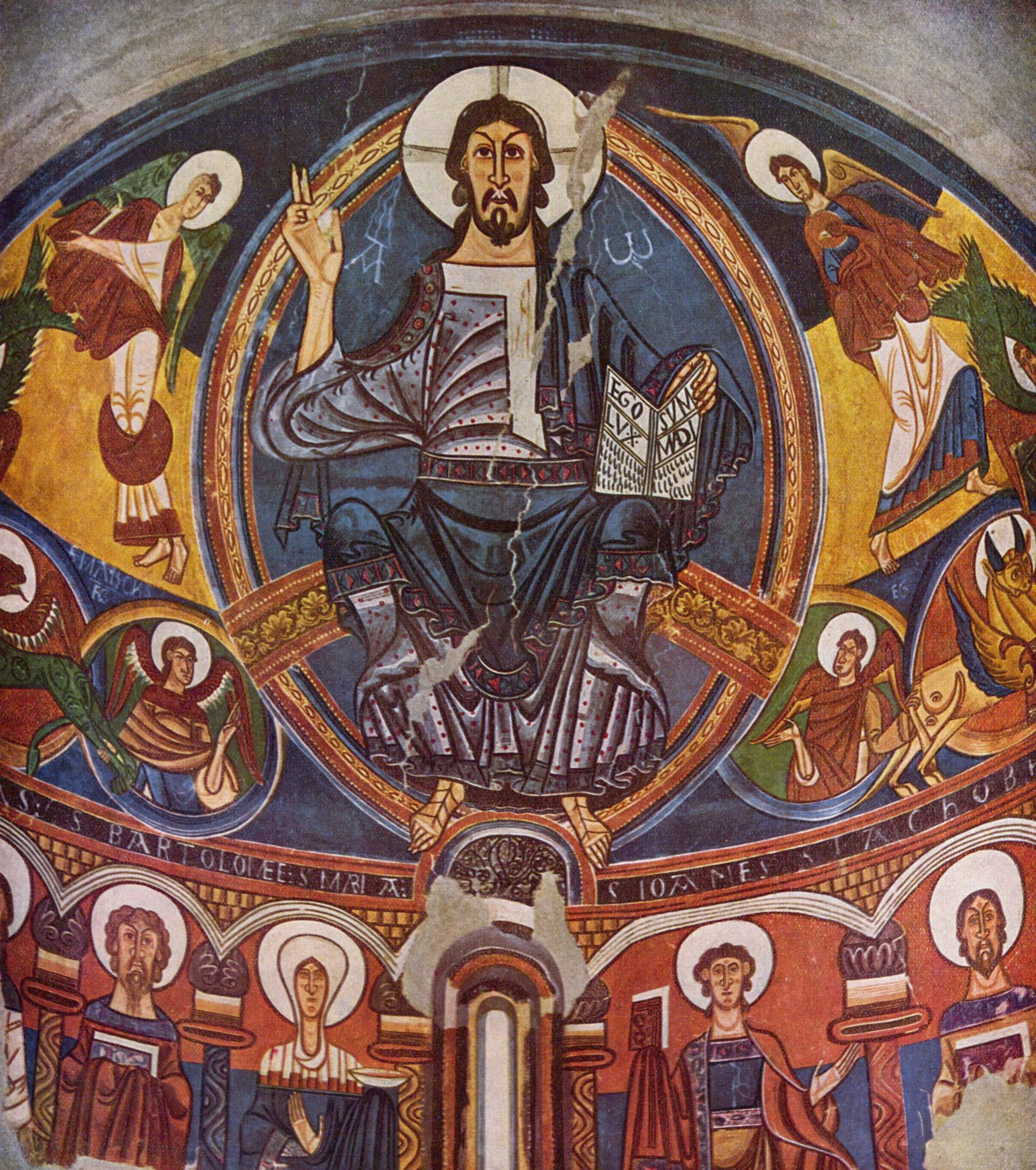
Pantocrator at the Apse of Sant Climent de Taüll, surrounded by the mandorla.

The Master of Taüll (or Master of Tahull) is considered the greatest mural painter of the 12th century in Catalonia, as well as one of the most important Romanesque painters in Europe. His main work is the church of Sant Climent de Taüll, with the famous apse painting now moved to the Museu Nacional d'Art de Catalunya in Barcelona.

Other paintings from the church of San Baudelio de Berlanga in Castile have also mostly been removed, with the larger New Testament frescos in American museums. These include work by two other painters. Two sections, transferred to canvas, are now in the Indianapolis Museum of Art, showing the Entry of Christ into Jerusalem and the Wedding at Cana. Other sections, including The Healing of the Blind Man and the Raising of Lazarus and The Temptation of Christ are in The Cloisters (Metropolitan Museum of Art) in New York, and in the Prado.The scenes of the Life of Christ are unusual in Spanish painting at this period; these are in American museums, while smaller elements including scenes of hunting and falconry and decorative copies of textiles are in Madrid as well as New York. The frescoes include that of a camel and of a war elephant, which were inspired by Muslim motifs.
