= Apse of Sant Climent, Taüll =

Catalan Romanesque fresco

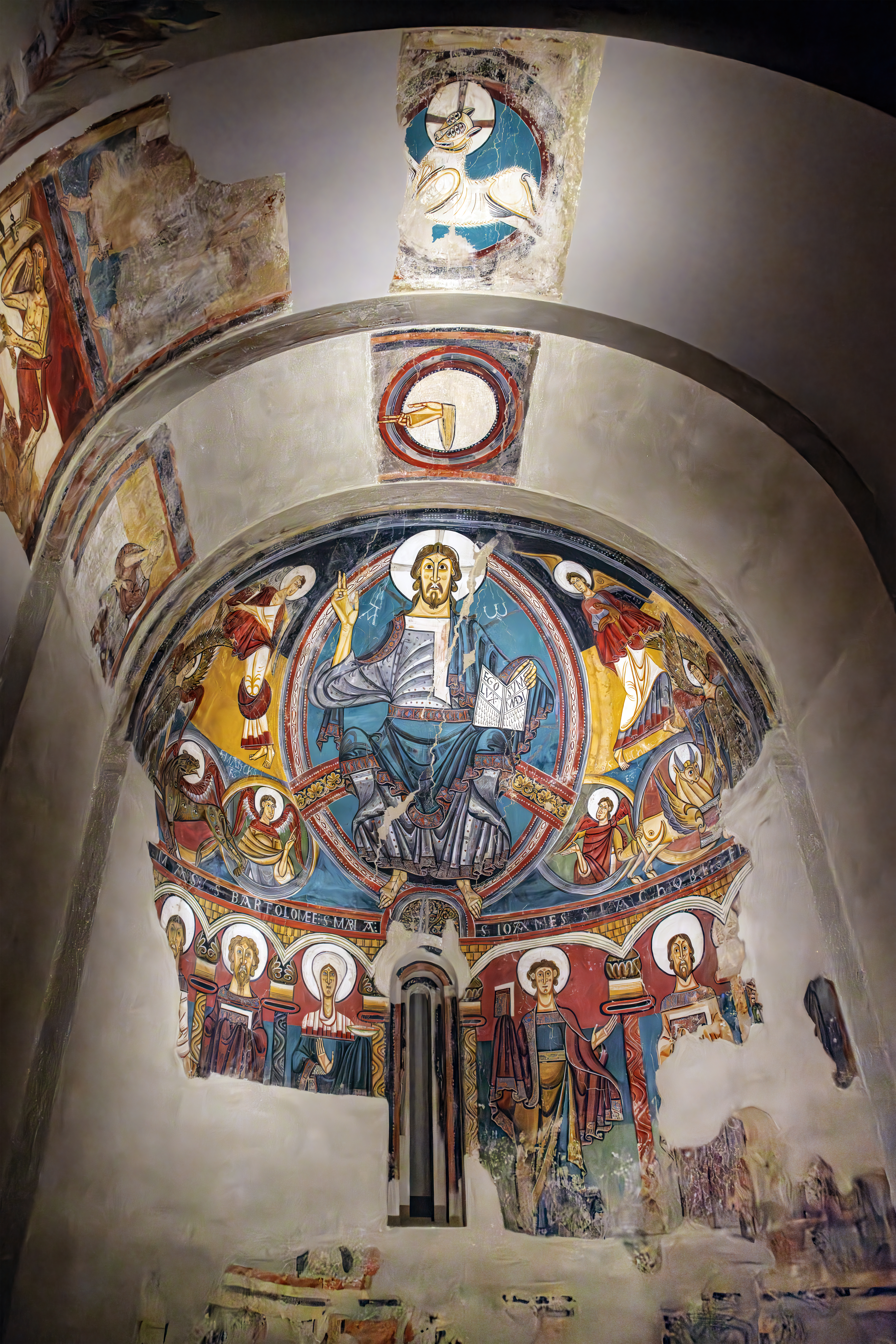
- Artist: Master of Taüll
- Year: c. 1123
- Type: Fresco transferred to canvas
- Dimensions: 620 cm × 360 cm (240 in × 140 in)
- Location: Museu Nacional d'Art de Catalunya; Barcelona

The Apse of Sant Climent de Taüll (Catalan: Absis de Sant Climent de Taüll) is a Romanesque fresco in the National Art Museum of Catalonia, Barcelona. The fresco is one of the masterpieces of the European Romanesque, from which the unknown Master of Taüll takes his name. It was painted in the early 12th century in the church of Sant Climent de Taüll in the Vall de Boí, Alta Ribagorça in the Catalan Pyrenees. The mural covered the apse of the church. In 1919-1923 it was moved, along with other parts of the fresco decoration, to Barcelona, in an attempt to preserve the murals in a stable, secure museum setting.

The mural was replaced by a replica, but some original decorations remain on the church walls. MNAC Barcelona also has the paintings from the triumphal arches, a side apse, the consecration inscription and an earlier window.

== Description ==
Its genius lies in the way it combines elements from different Biblical visions (Revelation, Isaiah and Ezekiel) to present the Christ of the Day of Judgement. Christ appears from the background causing a movement outwards from the centre of the composition, which is presided by the ornamental sense of the outlines and the skilful use of colour to create volume. The exceptional nature of this work and its pictorial strength have reached out to modernity and fascinated twentieth-century avant-garde artists like Picasso and Francis Picabia.

The round surface beneath Christ's feet represents the earth and the halo on his head represents divinity. Christ's right hand symbolizes blessing, and in his left hand he holds a book with the words EGO SUM LUX MUNDI, which translates in English to “I am the light of the world”. The symbols of Alpha and Omega hanging like lamps on either side of Christ, symbolize the beginning and end. The fourfold images represent four evangelists. To the right, an angel is seen beside the lion holding one of its hind legs, which is a symbol of St. Mark. To the left, an angel holding the tail of the bull is a symbol of St. Luke. The other two evangelists fit into the triangular space on either side of the mandorla. An angel holding the Gospel Book represents St. Matthew, and the other angel is St. John holding an eagle in his arms. Below the mural painting of Christ in the mandorla is St Thomas, St Bartholomew, Mother of God, St. John the Evangelist, St. James and San Felipe. The Mother of God holds a bowl where red rays emerge from it, which symbolize the blood of Christ.

== History ==
The paintings in the central apse of Sant Climent in Taüll are the most emblematic in the Museum's collection of Romanesque art and make up one of the most representative and one of the finest works of Romanesque art.

The central theme of the apse is a Theophany, or vision of God, at the end of time, based mainly on the text of Revelation. In the middle, Christ in Majesty inscribed in a mandorla, seated on the arc of Heaven and with the Earth at his feet, blesses with his right hand, while his left holds a book with the inscription EGO SUM LUX MUNDI (‘I am the light of the world’). On either side are the Alpha and the Omega, symbols that God is the beginning and the end of all things. He is surrounded by the four Evangelists. Saints, apostles and the Virgin Mary occupy the semi-cylinder and several scenes from the Old and New Testaments are depicted on the arches over the entrance to the apse. One scene that stands out is of Lazarus the beggar at the door of the rich man Epulon's house, on the intrados of the arch, and at the top, the hand of God and the Agnus Dei (the Lamb of God), symbolising the death and resurrection of Christ (Rev 5, 6–14).

The style combines the geometricisation of forms and the general symmetry of the composition with the decorativism in the details and ornamental elements.

The volume of the pronounced drapery is geometrical, emphasised by coloured lines and glazing, contrasting with the flat tones of the background. In addition, the symmetry, frontality, hieratic nature and the very representation of God could derive from Byzantine art, possibly via Italy. The bands of colour in the backgrounds, present in many Catalan Romanesque paintings, could remind us of what is known as Mozarabic illumination in tenth-century Hispanic manuscripts.

The exceptional artistic nature and the high quality of these paintings have been corroborated by the study of the pigments, which are of better quality and preparation than in other Catalan churches. Some imported pigments have even been found. Through the use of superimposed layers, the painter obtains more intense chromatic effects. Thus blue, obtained from aerinite, is applied over a layer of black, and cinnabar is applied over haematite to get red.

Painted on one of the columns of the nave is the church's inscription of consecration by bishop Ramon de Roda from Ribagorza on 10 December 1123. This reference is fundamental for dating the paintings, of which there are still remains in situ.
