= Nikolaus Hagenauer =

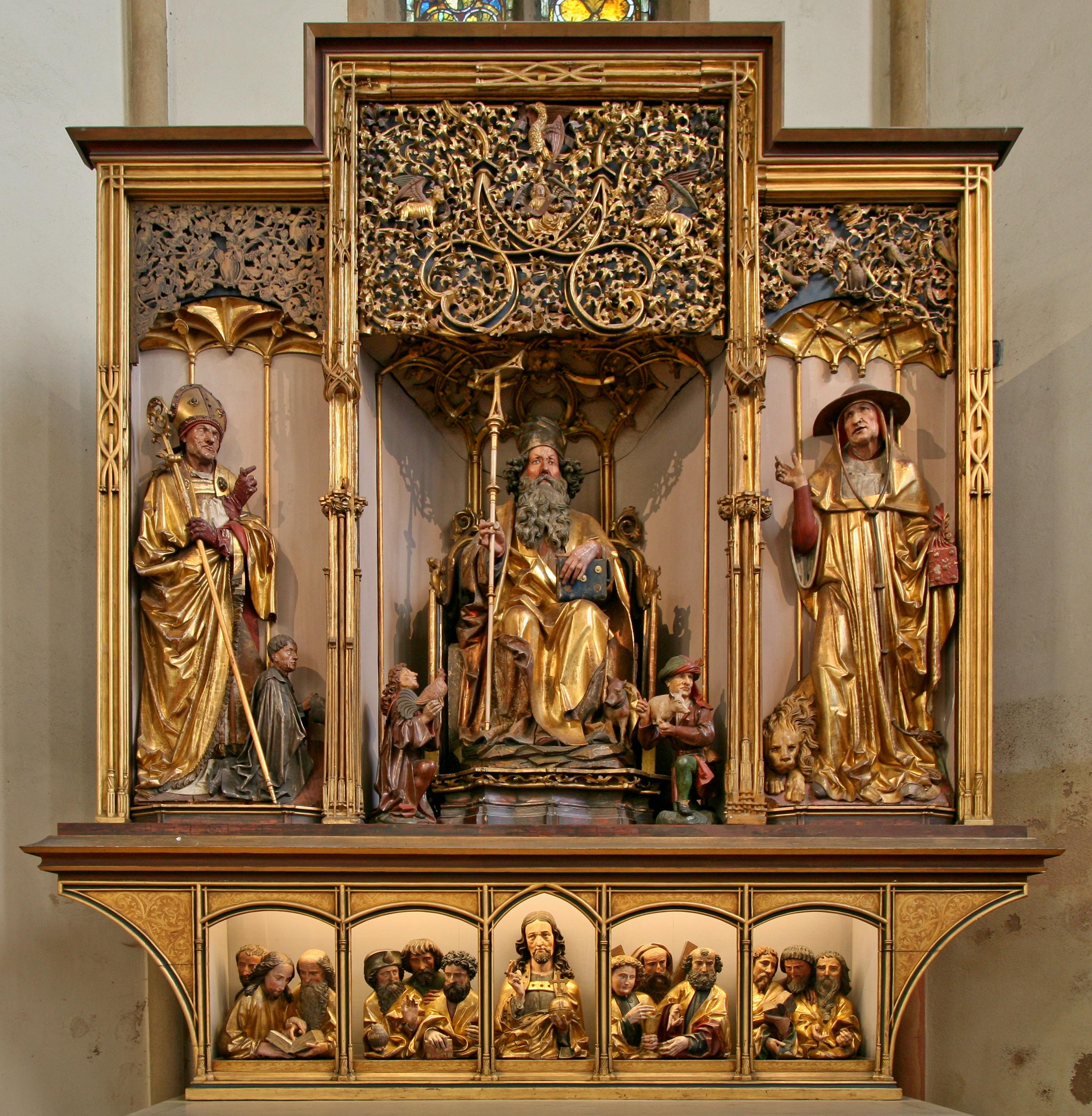
Interior of the Isenheim Altarpiece (c. 1500), attributed to Nikolaus Hagenauer

Nikolaus Hagenauer (c. 1445/1460 — before 1538) was an Alsatian late gothic sculptor from Haguenau (Alsace in the Holy Roman Empire, present day France). He was most likely born as Niklas Zimmerlin, but was also documented and signed works as Niclas Hagenauer, Niklaus Hagenauer, Niclas Hagnower, Niklaus Hagnower, Niclas von Hagenau and other variants.
