= Mandorla =

Almond-shaped aureola (frame)

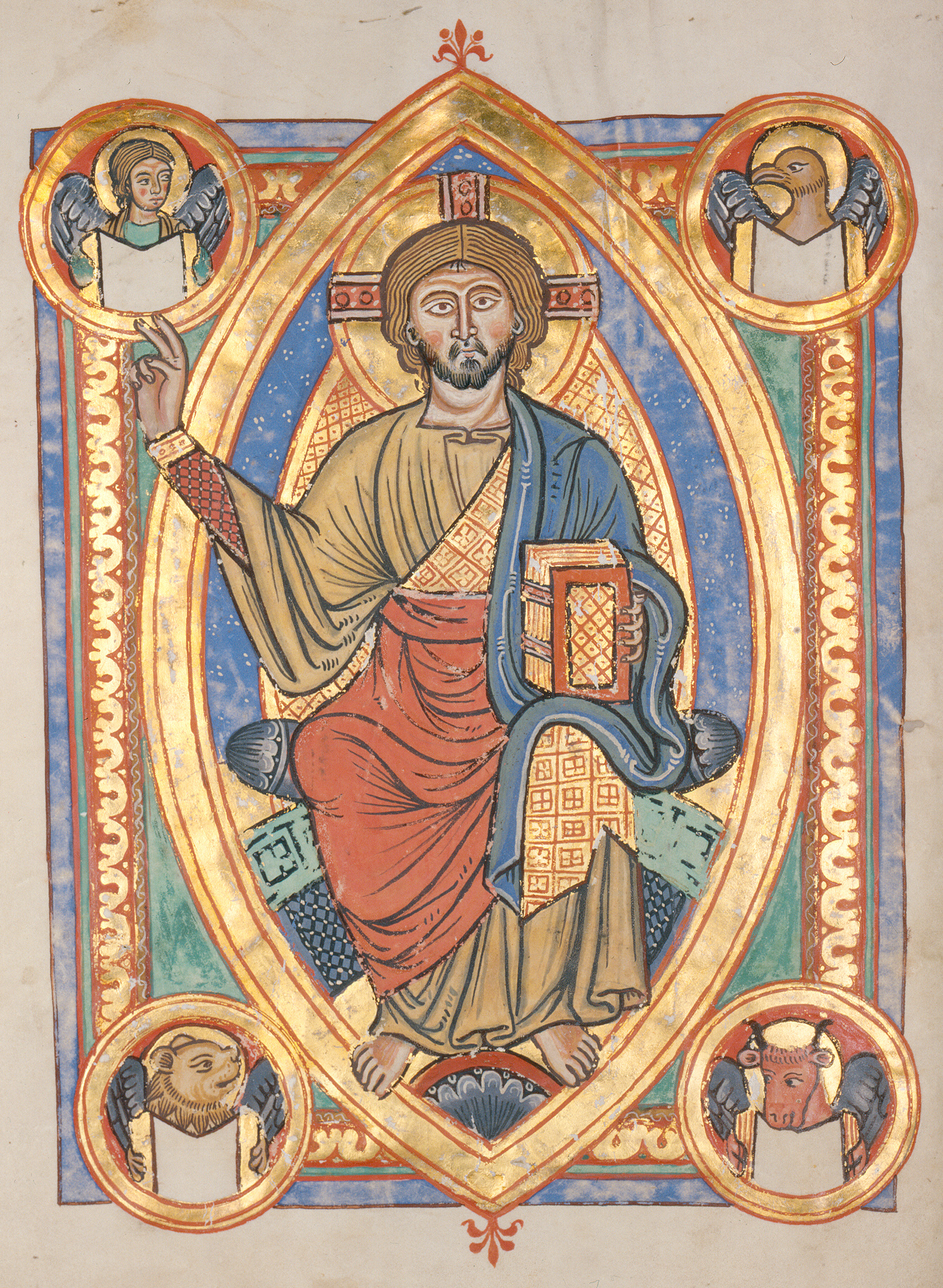
Christ in Majesty shown within a mandorla shape in a medieval illuminated manuscript.

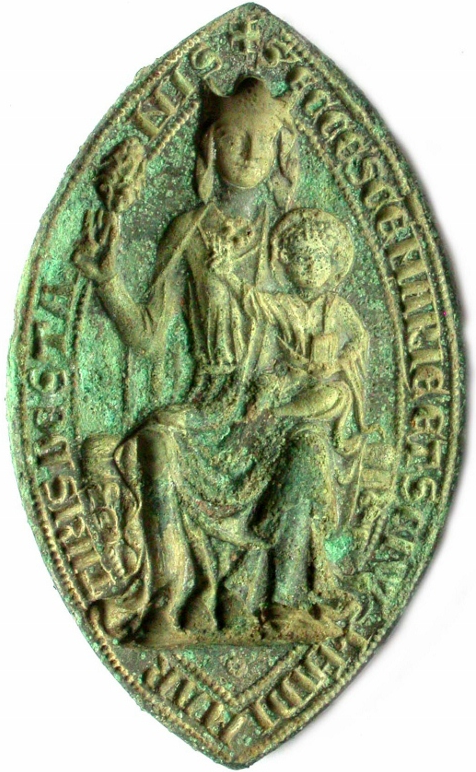
13/14th c. seal of Stone Priory in Staffordshire, England, in the shape of a mandorla

A mandorla is an almond-shaped aureola, i.e., a frame that surrounds the totality of an iconographic figure. It is usually synonymous with vesica, a lens shape. Mandorlas often surround the figures of Jesus Christ and the Virgin Mary in traditional Christian iconography. It is distinguished from a halo in that it encircles the entire body and not just the head. It is commonly used to frame the figure of Christ in Majesty in early medieval and Romanesque art, as well as Byzantine art of the same periods. It is the shape generally used for mediaeval ecclesiastical seals, secular seals generally being round.

== Depictions ==
Mandorla is Italian for the almond nut, to which shape it refers. It may be elliptical or depicted as a vesica, a lens shape as the intersection of two circles. Rhombic mandorlas are also sometimes depicted.

In Byzantine and Eastern Orthodox iconography, the mandorla appears in scenes such as the Transfiguration, the Resurrection, the Ascension, and the Dormition. Art historian Rostislava Todorova describes the mandorla in Byzantine art as a visual sign of the indescribable Glory of God. In later Byzantine and post-Byzantine iconography, dark or progressively darkening mandorlas could express the uncreated light of God's energies through the apophatic language of "super-luminous darkness", a theme associated with Hesychast theology.

In architectural iconography, the frame of the mandorla is often marked with decorative mouldings. The interior of the mandorla is usually undecorated, but may contain the symbols for Alpha and Omega (Α and Ω) or, less frequently, depictions of a starry sky or clouds.

In a famous Catholic Romanesque fresco of Jesus Christ in Glory in Sant Climent de Taüll, the scriptural inscription Ego Sum Lux Mundi ("I Am the Light of the World") is incorporated in the mandorla design.

The tympanum at Conques has Christ, with a gesture carved in Romanesque sculpture, indicate the angels at his feet bearing candlesticks. Six surrounding stars that resemble blooming flowers, indicate the planets that were known at the time, including the Moon. Here the symbolism evokes Christ as the Sun.

In one special case, at Cervon (Nièvre), Jesus Christ is seated and surrounded by eight stars that resemble blooming flowers. At Conques the flowers are six-petalled. At Cervon, where the almond motif is repeated in the rim of the mandorla, they are five-petalled, as are true almond flowers, which are the first flowers to bloom after Winter, even before vernation of the leaves of the tree. The symbolism of the nine-branched Chanukkiyah candelabrum may be relevant. In the 12th century a great school of Judaic thought radiated from Narbonne, coinciding with the origins of the Kabbalah. Furthermore, at Cervon the eight stars/flowers only are six-petalled: the "Root of David", the "Morningstar", mentioned at the end of the Book of Revelation (22: 16). In one of the oldest manuscripts of the complete Hebrew Bible, the Leningrad Codex, the Star of David is embedded in an octagon.

In the symbolism of Saint Hildegard of Bingen OSB the mandorla symbolizes the Cosmos.

== See also ==
- Vesica piscis
