= Quadriga phenomenon =

Quadriga phenomenon is a condition wherein the middle finger is flexed because of the connection between the flexor digitorum profundus (FDP) tendons.
