= Sant Climent, Taüll =

Church in Vall de Boí, Spain

Saint Clement of Taüll
- Sant Climent de Taüll
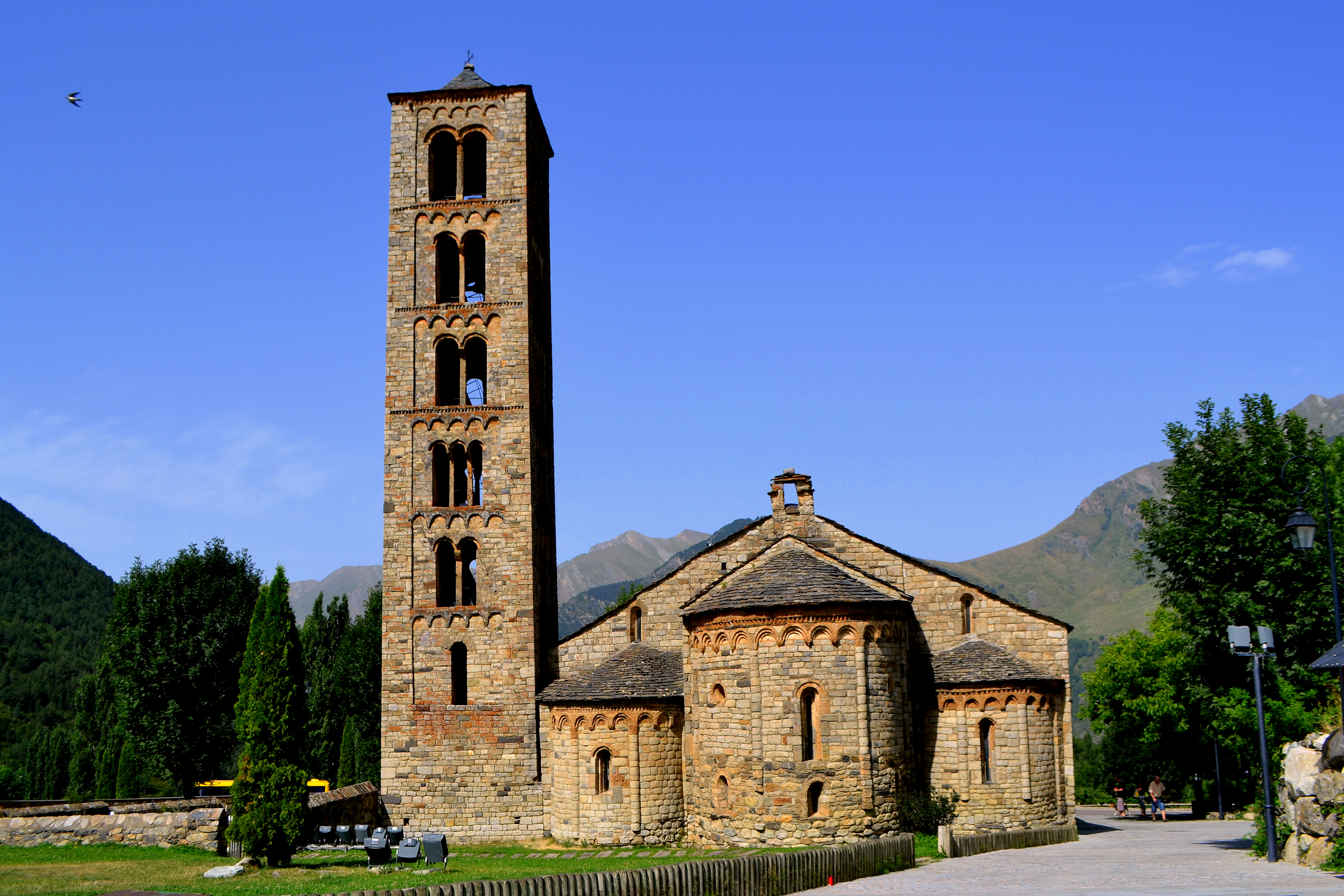
- Sant Climent de Taüll

Religion
- Affiliation: Roman Catholic
- Ecclesiastical or organizational status: Parish church

Location
- Location: Taüll, Catalonia, Spain
- Interactive map of Saint Clement of Taüll
- Coordinates: 42°31′03″N 0°50′55″E

Architecture
- Type: Church
- Style: Romanesque
- UNESCO World Heritage Site
- Official name: Catalan Romanesque Churches of the Vall de Boí
- Type: Cultural
- Criteria: ii, iv
- Designated: 2000 (24th session)
- Reference no.: 988
- Region: Europe and North America

Sant Climent de Taüll (Catalan pronunciation: [ˈsaŋ kliˈmɛn də təˈuʎ]), also known as the Church of St. Clement of Tahull, is a Roman Catholic church in Catalonia, Spain. It is an example of Romanesque architecture. Other influences include the Lombard and Byzantine styles, which can be seen throughout the exterior and interior of the building. The church is a basilica plan structure with three naves, each of them with a terminal apse, and large columns separating the side naves. Connecting to the church is a slim bell tower that has six floors plus a base. The artwork inside the church include the famous mural paintings by the Master of Taüll (contained in the different apses and the keys of the arches), as well as the wooden altar frontal. These works of art represent different aspects of Christianity that can also be found in many other works of art. The most famous fresco, of Christ in Majesty in the main apse of the church, has been moved to the Museu Nacional d'Art de Catalunya in Barcelona.

== Historical context ==
Sant Climent de Taüll is located in Taüll in the municipality of Valley of Boí, in the province of Lleida, Catalonia, Spain. The exact date of construction is unknown; the church was consecrated on December 10, 1123. In 1064, before Sant Climent de Taüll was constructed, it was an object of sale and exchange by several different counts, including the Counts of Pallars Sovereign (I Artau and his wife Lucia), the Counts of Pallars Jussà (Ramon IV and his wife Valença), as well as tle Erill and other possessions. Sant Climent de Taüll was devoted to and consecrated by Guillem Ramon, Bishop of Roda-Barbastro. One day later Guillem Ramon also consecrated Santa Maria de Taüll, another Romanesque church located near Sant Climent de Taüll.

Sant Climent de Taüll is a Romanesque-style church greatly influenced by the Lombard style, which can be seen through its exterior decoration. The bell tower is an example of Byzantine influence, because it stands out for its verticality. The church was intended as a place for Christian worship, unlike other churches of the time, which were intended as a pilgrimage. The artwork in Sant Climent de Taüll was important in bringing the art into the public atmosphere. The main work of art is the mural painting, located on the central apse of the church. The identity of the painter is unknown, but is referred to as Master Taüll. The altar-frontal was created by a native Catalan artist, possibly in a workshop in La Seo de Urgel.

== Technical analysis ==
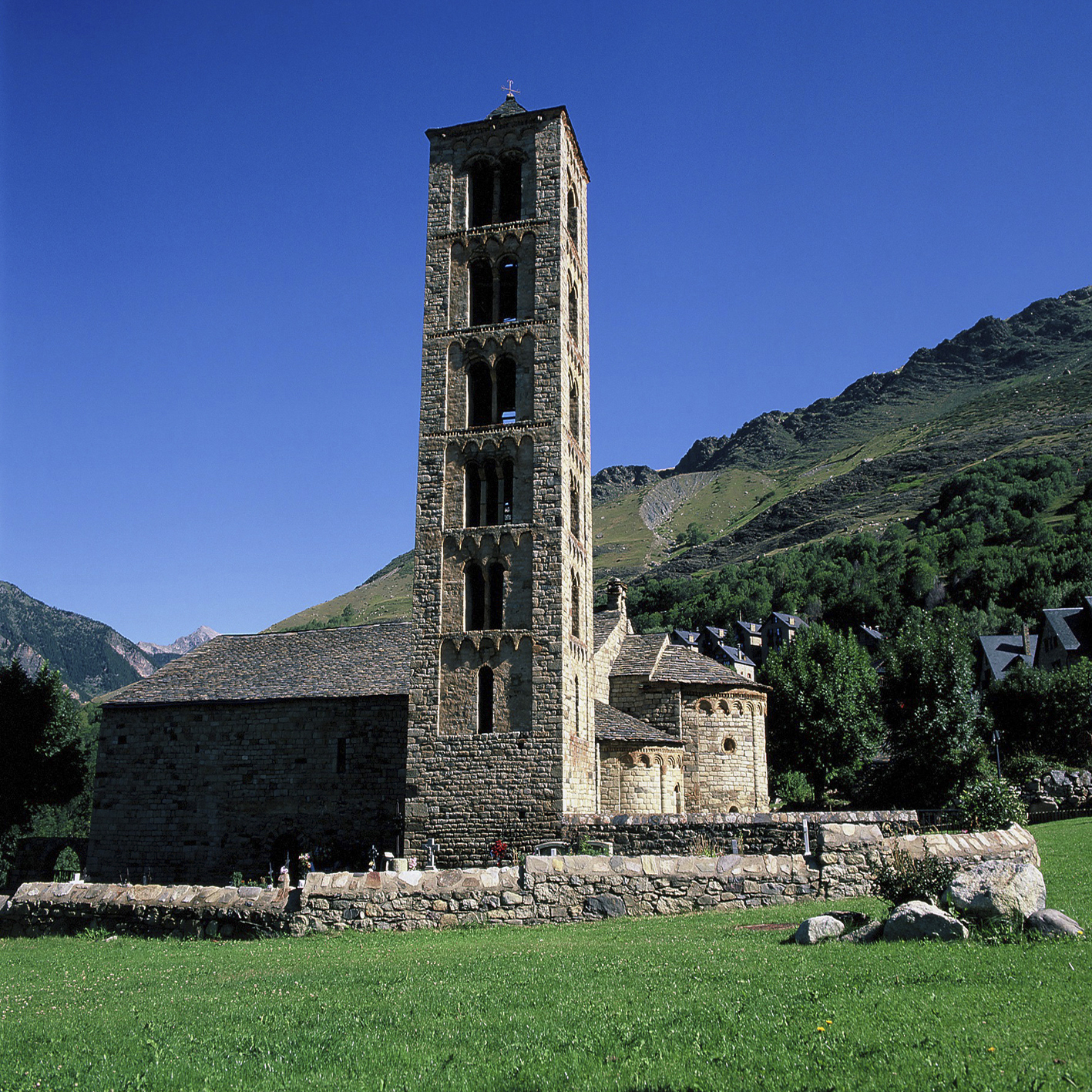
Side view of Sant Climent, Taüll

Sant Climent de Taüll is the largest, most well preserved, and has the most outstanding architecture out of all the churches in the Valley of Boí. The church is a basilica plan structure, that has three naves (each of them with a terminal apse), and large columns separating the side naves. One of the doorways opens on the west side of the building, with the remains of what might have been a porch. The other openings are located on the south side and on the access tower. The facades of the church do not have any decoration, but the apses have simple Lombard decorations and are built with stone and brick. The central apse on the exterior is decorated by groups of four arches, separated by half columns. The apsidioles (apses on either side of the central apse), have groups of three arches instead of four, with each of the apses having one window each. In addition, the central apse has three arched windows located on ground level and two portholes on either side of the central apse.

In the south corner of the church there is a tall, slim bell tower that has a square plan with a prism-shaped roof. The tower has seven floors (base floor plus six), where the base is the foundation of the entire structure. As we ascend through the bell tower, the structure becomes lighter in weight because of the larger windows near the top of the tower. On each level there are the same number of windows on the four sides of the tower, and there are five arcs in the space around the windows.

Inside Sant Climent de Taüll three naves are separated by three cylindrical columns. The columns are made of amalgamated stone, which support the arcades, and the roof of the church has wooden beams. The first column on the north side of the church near the apse was found to have the inscription of the consecration of the church. This document is painted with white letters on red and black background and is now preserved in the National Museum of Catalan Art. The interior of the church (the walls of the naves, apses and columns) were originally covered with polychrome decoration. In the early twentieth century, the National Art Museum of Catalonia in Barcelona took the mural paintings inside the church to protect and preserve them. An exact replica of the mural painting on the central apse was made in place of the original. However, the original mural painting on the northern apse can only be seen in the National Art Museum of Catalonia. The removal of the mural paintings was done by applying horsehide glue. The hardened glue was then peeled off, carrying the pigments of the mural with it.

Mural painting is an art that is painted and applied to the wall, ceiling or other permanent surfaces that are sufficient in size. The technique used is called fresco, where the paint is applied on plaster on walls and/or ceilings. The pigment is mixed with water on a small layer of wet lime mortar or plaster, where it is later absorbed. After several hours, the plaster dries while reacting with the air. This creates a chemical reaction making the pigment stick to the plaster. Over a long period of time, the painting will end up with brilliant colors. One of the main mural paintings is four meters in diameter located on the central apse. There are several holes, due to excess moisture, on the original mural painting on the central apse that have not been restored. A polychrome wood carving and other objects are also located inside the church, some of which were successfully restored.

Sant Climent de Taüll had the earliest wooden altar-frontal, which was 1.36 m × 0.98 m in size. When it reached Barcelona it was covered with a coat of paint which was removed. An inscription on the center of the upper frame shows that in 1579 the altar-frontal was repainted. The wooden altar frontal is enclosed by a narrow wooden frame, which is held together at the four corners with wooden dowels. The figures were each carved separately, and then were attached to the back of the panel using wooden dowels. The four side divisions contain a blind arcade of three arches, where there are figures located directly underneath. The arches are formed from tall capitals, which are supported by slim colonnettes with torus molding, as well as a high base. The upper right corner is slightly damaged, though some of the original colour can be seen on the lower left corner of the antependium. The frame was painted green and yellow, and there are indications that the frame originally had some stucco ornament. The wooden altar frontal used to have four symbols of the evangelists that had filled the outside of the mandorla, but these have been lost.

== Formal and stylistic analysis ==
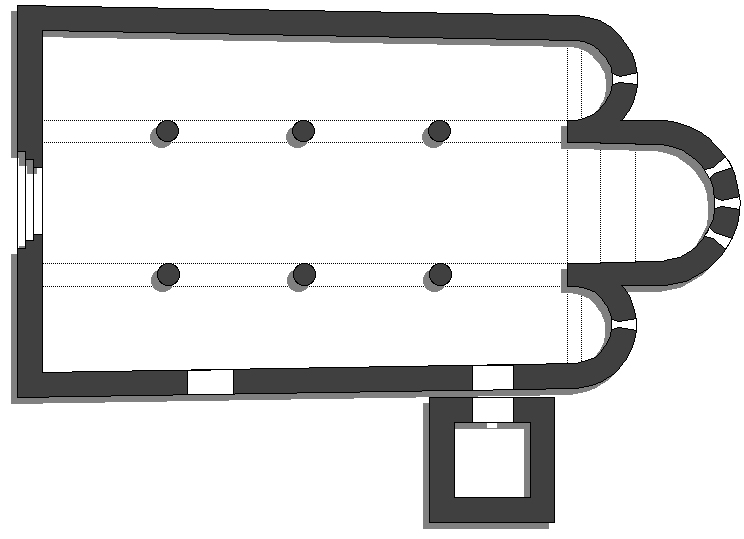
Church plan

Sant Climent de Taüll is a form of Romanesque architecture and contains Romanesque artwork. Romanesque architecture is classified by its semi-circular arches on the buildings. It is also best recognized by its massive size, thick walls, round arches, sturdy piers, groin vaults, large towers and decorative arcading. During the time of Romanesque architecture, many more churches were built than castles. The architecture is often a symmetrical plan, and the exterior of the building is very simplistic with clear forms. The building material for the exterior varies in different structures, although brick is generally used. The arches, doors, windows, vaults and arcades used during this time are almost always semicircular.

Mural decorations were a form of art used during the Romanesque period. The paintings were placed on large wall surfaces and on plain, curving vaults. Often it is seen in a mosaic, where the focal point is the semi-dome of the apse with Christ the majesty in the centre. This is very characteristic of the mural painting located on the central apse in Sant Climent de Taüll. The mural painting of the figure of Christ wears a greyish, white robe with a blue mantle. The volumes in the folds of the robe reflect some movement and realism in the image. Christ is located within a mandorla that has a blue background with a blue and red frame, decorated with pearls and circles. The figure of Christ goes beyond the frame of the mandorla, and his feet are resting on a hemisphere. His face is in a perfect axial symmetry which is framed by long hair. The mandorla is placed on a background of three horizontal parallel bands in the colours blue, ocher and black.

Located underneath the mandorla is a black band with white writing. On each side of the centre window (below the black band) are three arches resting on columns of capitals in green, red and black. In between the figures of the Virgin Mary and five saints are columns with wavy line patterns going vertically. These figures lie on top of a background of three horizontal bands in the colours red, blue and green. The faces of the figures in the bottom half of the mural painting is similar to Christ in the mandorla, except they wear different coloured robes.

Sant Climent de Taüll has a basilica plan structure, which is similar to early Christian architecture such as the Roman basilica of Leptis Magna and the Basilica of Old St. Peter. Similar to early Christian architecture, Sant Climent de Taüll has a central nave and an apse. The difference is that Sant Climent de Taüll has three naves and three apses, and a bell tower, whereas early Christian architecture has side aisles, transepts, a narthex and an atrium. In addition, the Santa Maria Maggiore, a basilica in Rome, has a clerestory, whereas the Sant Climent de Taüll is the opposite because it has very few windows.

The mural paintings in Sant Climent de Taüll have elements similar to early Christian paintings. In the central apse of the church, there is a figure of a Pantocrator (Christ in Majesty) surrounded by a mandorla. The Pantocrator can also be seen in the Golden Age of Byzantium, specifically in Hagia Sophia in Constantinople. It can also be seen in the Court School of Charlemagne during the Carolingian Renaissance. The Alpha, Omega and the halo around Christ's head can be seen in both the Romanesque and Byzantium age and in the Catacomb of Comodilla.

== Iconographical analysis ==
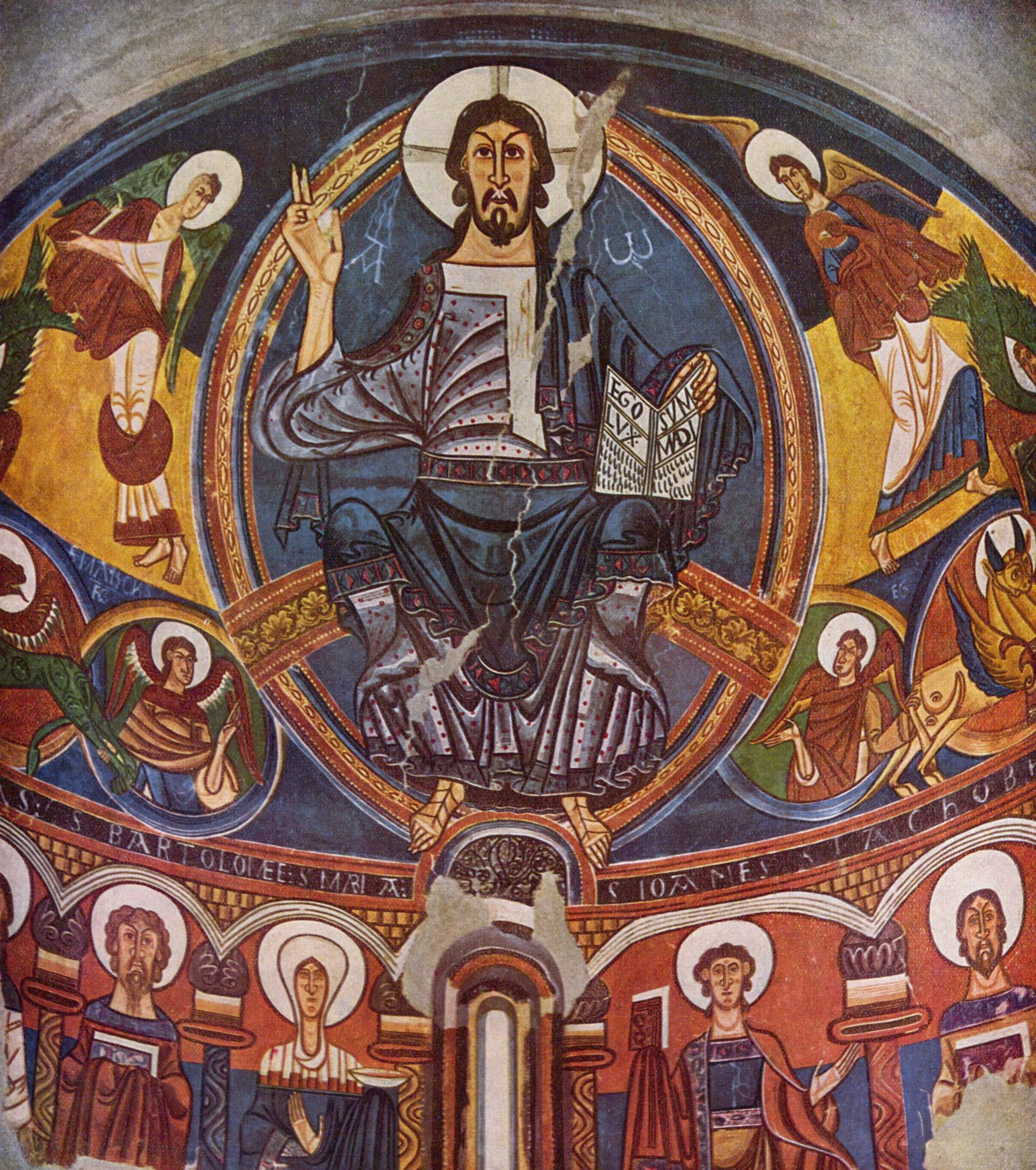
Pantocrator by the Master of Taüll

Sant Climent de Taüll has many mural paintings; however, the main and most famous mural painting is located at the central apse and is of Christ in Majesty within a mandorla. This has now been moved to Barcelona and replaced by a replica.

In the lower part of the second triumphal arch appears a figure of the Agnus Dei contained in a circle with a blue background. The Agnus Dei is a mystic lamb that is presented as having seven eyes and holding a book. On the left side of the same arc, there are scenes of Lazarus, who expresses grief while a dog licks his wounds at the door of a rich man. On the front, left side of the triumphal arch, there is an image of an unknown character holding a helmet. The vertical walls directly under the triumphal arches preceding the apse have an image of saints. Only a few saints, Peter, Clement, and Cornelius, can be identified. In the triumphal arch on the right side, there is a scene of a man with an ax hitting the head of another person. On the northern side of the apse there is a mural painting of six angels. In front of the apse, there is an image of what appears to be a dog on top of the remains of a frame. Under the dog there is a possible image of some type of bird, though it is hard to make out the exact image.

The church has a wooden altar frontal, which is similar to the mural painting in the central apse, because it consists of Christ in a mandorla surrounded by the four tetramorphs. The figure of Christ wears a crown and is seated on a throne with a foot rest. The side compartments are divided into upper and lower registers, each with three figures. There are twelve figures in total on the upper and lower register on either side on Christ, which represents the twelve apostles. In the bottom right register there is a figure of Judas who is hanged. The image of the dead figure with a devil eating his vitals is a symbol of remorse.

== Gallery ==
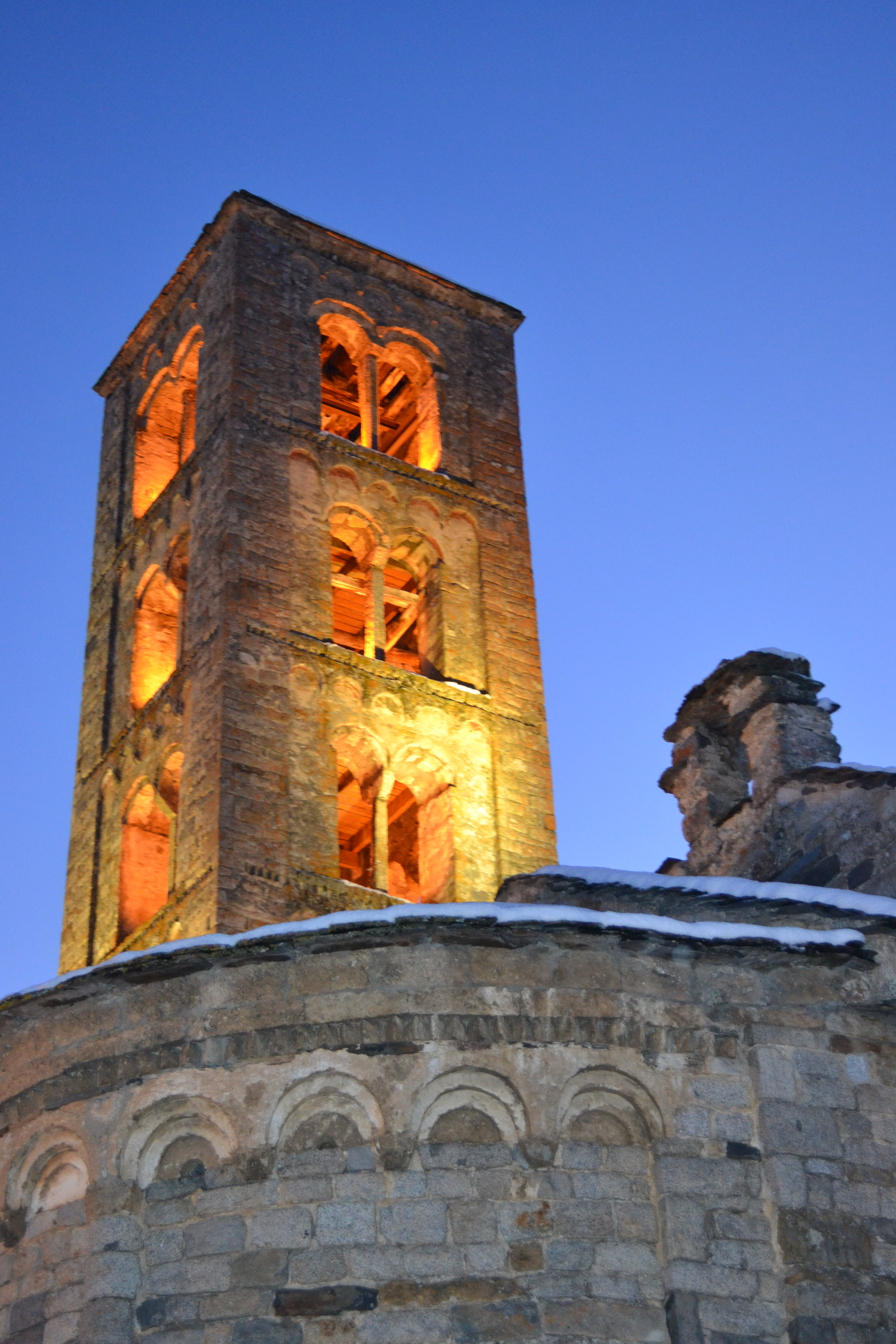
Night view of bell-tower, Sant Climent, Taüll

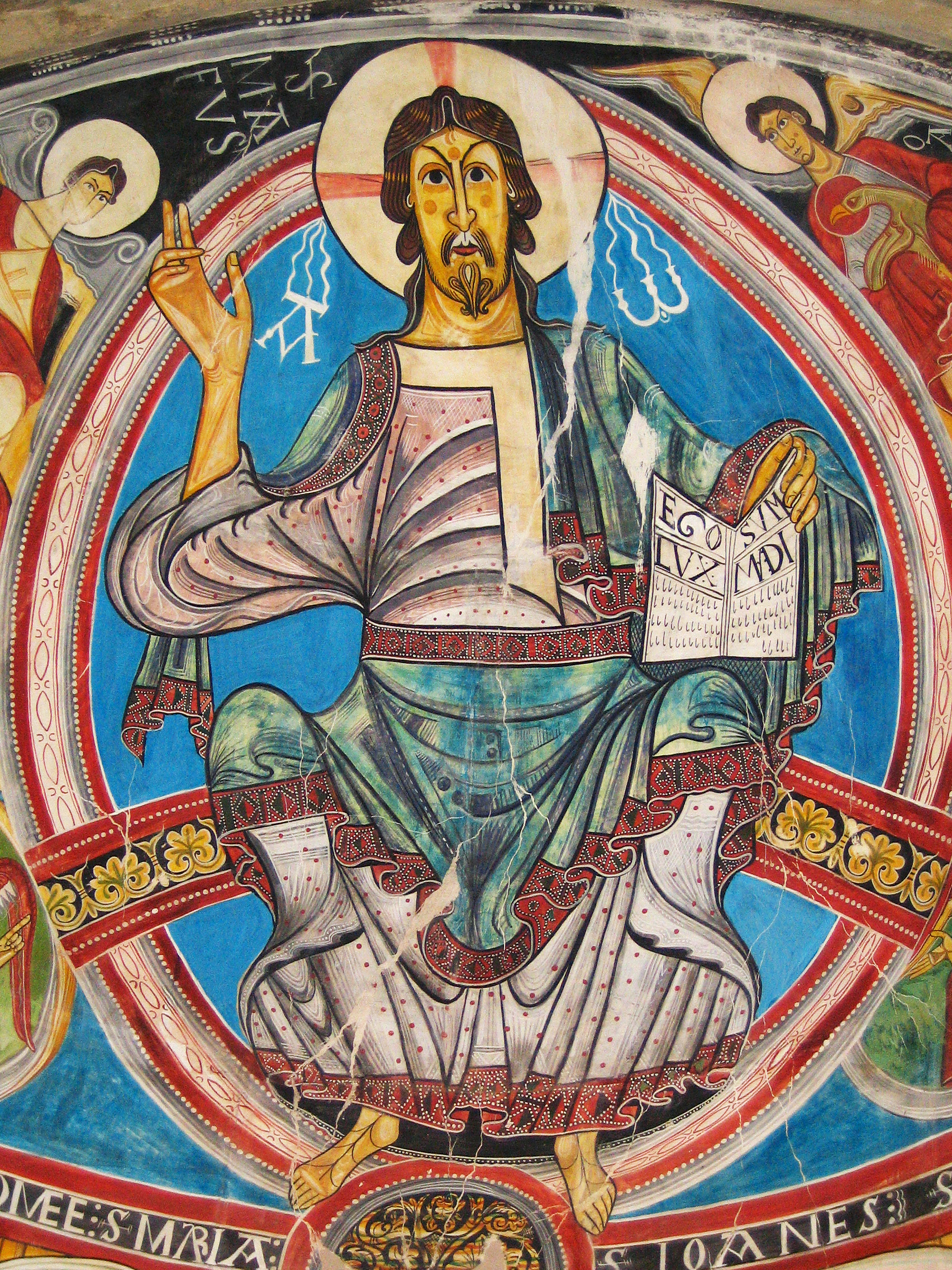
Christ Pantocrator, Sant Climent, Taüll

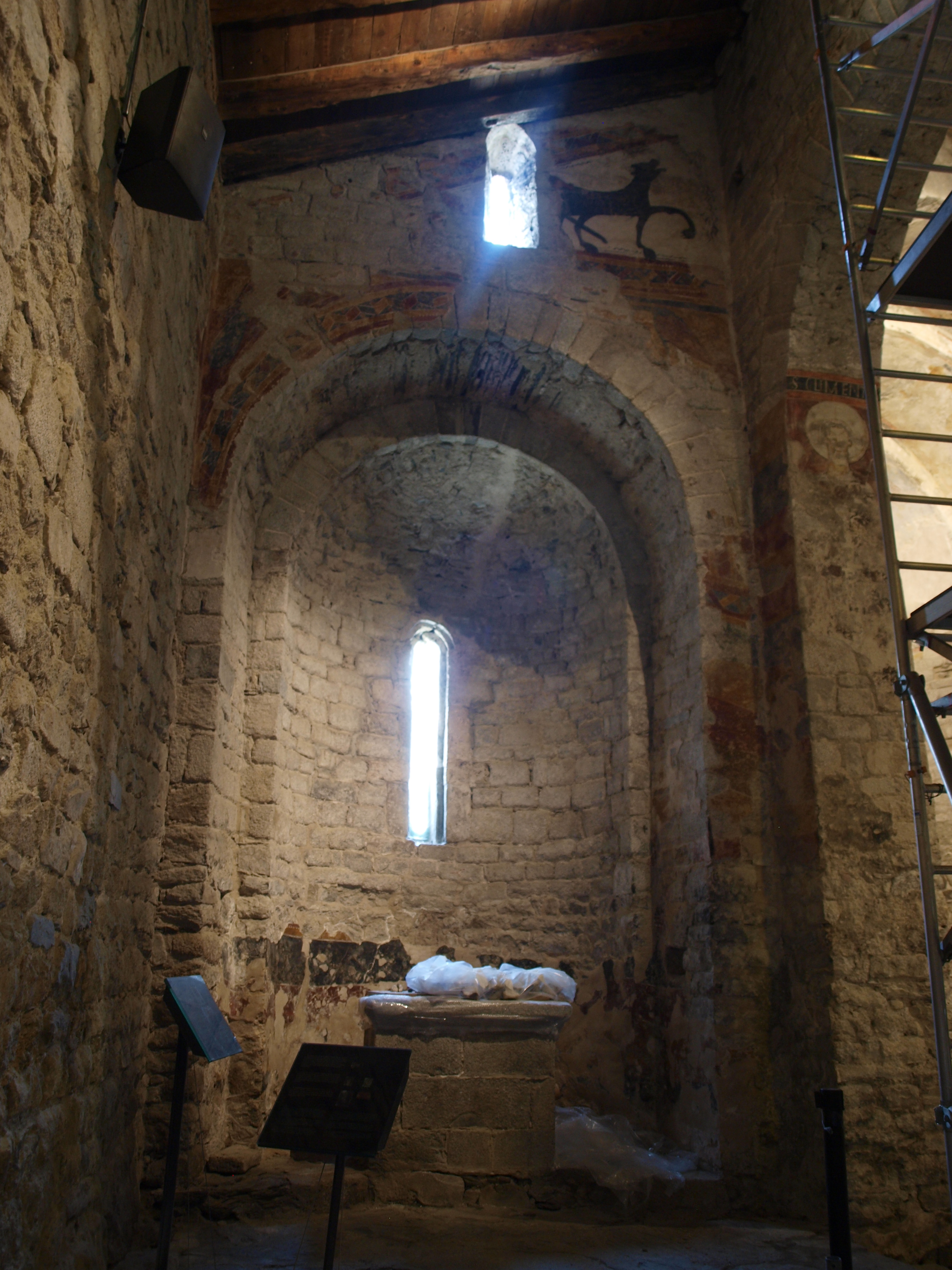
Inside view, North Apse, Sant Climent, Taüll

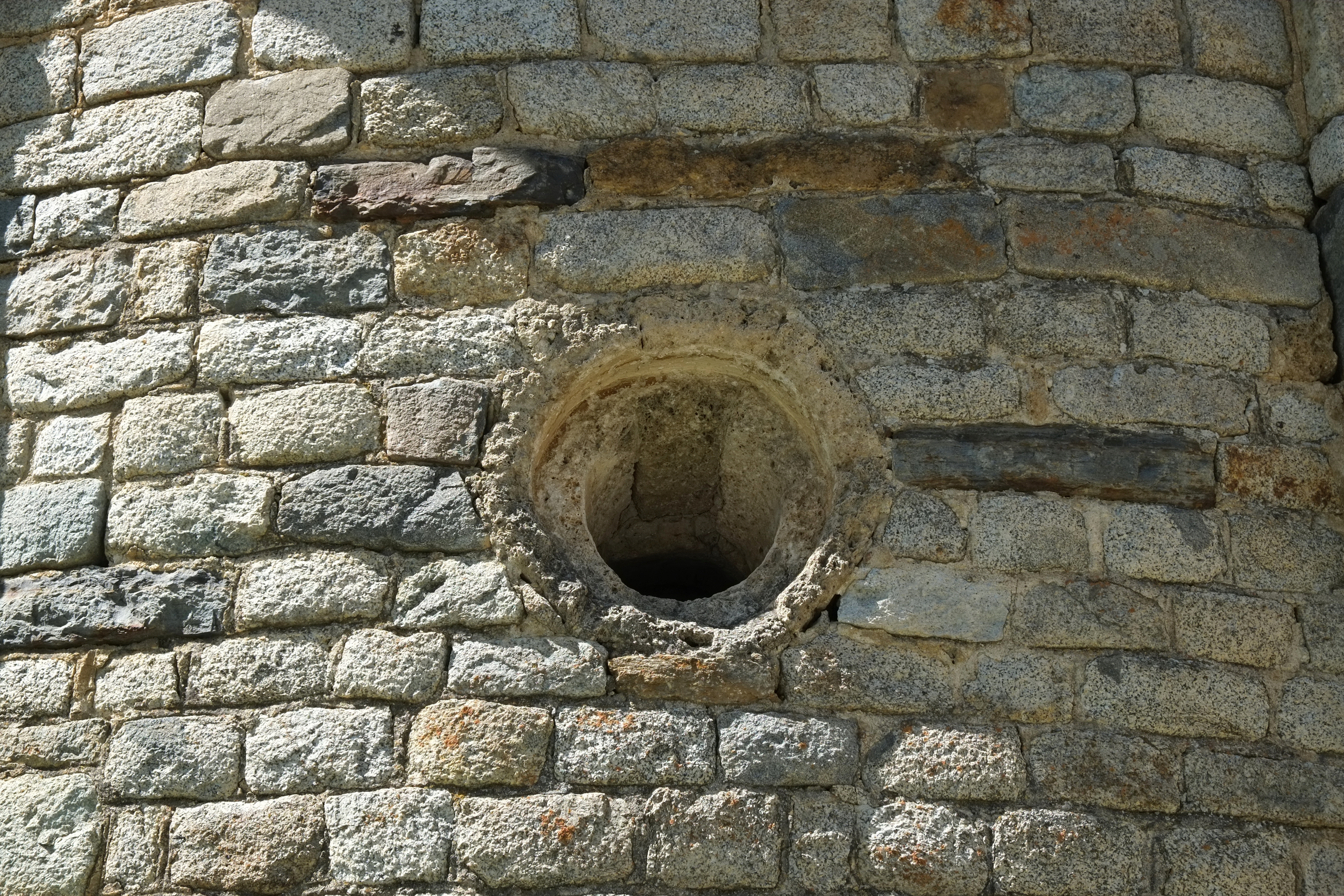
Small window in Apse, Sant Climent, Taüll

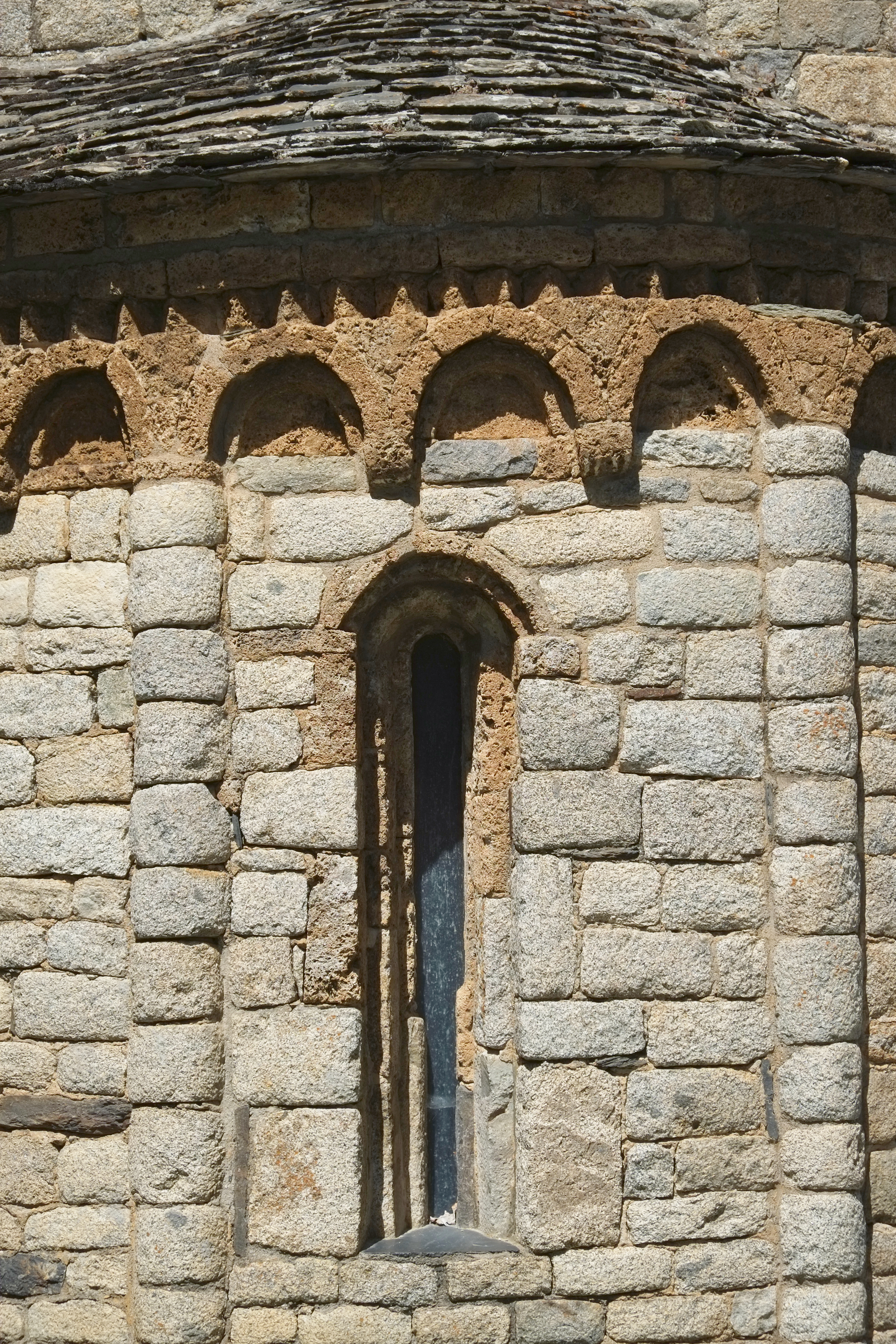
Apse, Sant Climent, Taüll

== See also ==
- First Romanesque
