= Lambeth Bible =

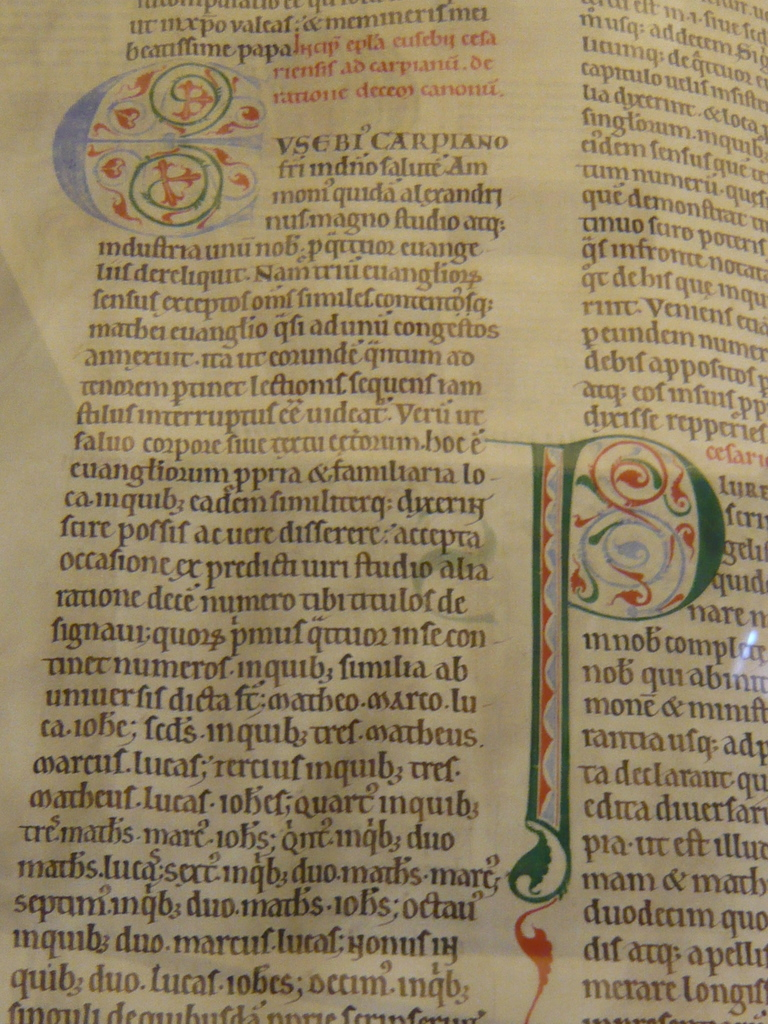
Detail of a leaf from the second volume of the Lambeth Bible

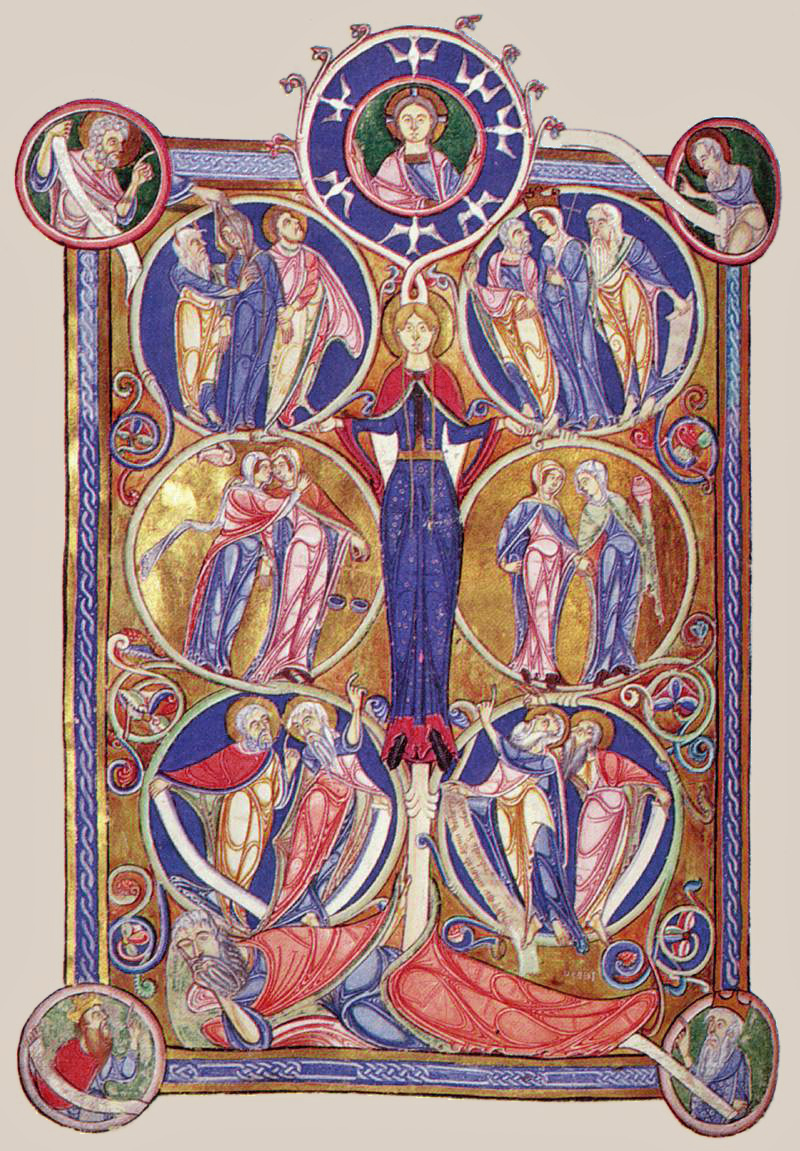
The Tree of Jesse, illumination on f. 198r

The Lambeth Bible is a 12th-century illuminated manuscript (perhaps produced circa 1150–1170), among the finest surviving giant Bibles from Romanesque England. It exists in two volumes; the first is in Lambeth Palace Library (MS 3), where it has been housed since the library's establishment in 1610, as verified by Archbishop Bancroft's manuscript catalogue. This volume covers Genesis to Job on 328 leaves of vellum measuring circa 520 x 355 mm; the second incomplete volume (covering Psalms to Revelation) is in the Maidstone Museum & Art Gallery (MS P.5).

The style of the illumination is clearly influenced by the work of Master Hugo, the illuminator of the Bury Bible. The Lambeth Bible bears close stylistic resemblance to the Gospel book made for Abbot Wedric of Liessies Abbey (Hainault) in 1146, of which only two leaves survive (the rest having been destroyed at Metz in World War II), now in Avesnes-sur-Helpe.

For many years the first volume in the Lambeth Palace Library was paired with another volume (MS P.5) in the library, but in 1924 it was realized that the correct pairing was with the Maidstone volume.

== Provenance ==
The Lambeth Bible does not have a press-mark or any other indication of its initial owner or origin. Furthermore, it cannot be located in medieval records of English monastic establishments. As a result, there has been much debate about the provenance of the Lambeth Bible. Eric Millar proposed a Canterbury provenance, which C. R. Dodwell supported in his study of the Canterbury scriptorium of 1954. Millar and Dodwell based their theory of a Canterbury provenance on some entries from the sixteenth century that occur on folio 310r in the Maidstone volume. These entries show that around 1541, the manuscript was in Lenham, a town halfway between Canterbury and Maidstone, and provide evidence that there was a possible connection between the new Lenham owners of the manuscript and the monastery of Christ Church in Canterbury. More recently, Josef Reidmaier also argued that the manuscript was produced in the Christ Church scriptorium in Canterbury around 1150. Riedmaier criticizes Dodwell's evidence of a Canterbury provenance as inadequate, since it was based primarily on storage records of the manuscript's location from the sixteenth century. He argues that a Canterbury provenance is accurate, but that the strongest evidence for this is actually found in the textual, structural, and iconographic characteristics of the Lambeth Bible. Dorothy Shepard argues that the book was produced in the scriptorium of St Augustine's Abbey between 1150-70. To support her theory, Shepard cites other bibles produced in the scriptorium at St Augustine's which contain the same prefatory materials as the Lambeth Bible. However, none of the divisions of the two-volume Bibles included in the inventory of the St Augustine’s library correspond to that of the Lambeth Bible. Christopher de Hamel instead links the Bible to Faversham Abbey, and claims that it was being produced for King Stephen. He supports his claim by drawing attention to the frequent royal imagery in the Bible, and the short period between 1146 (when the illuminator was in France) and 1154 (King Stephen's death) as an explanation for the Bible's incomplete state.

== Description ==
Both volumes of the Lambeth Bible are considerably large, measuring 20.5 x 13.5 inches. The Lambeth volume (MS 3) is generally in excellent condition, with only a few missing pages. Aside from those and the fifteenth-century binding replacement, it remains largely in its original state. The Maidstone volume (MS P.5) is in a state of disrepair, with the binding showing signs of deterioration, early pages torn out or damaged, and the majority of illuminated pages and initials missing.

=== Layout ===
The two main scribes responsible for composing the manuscript were also tasked with determining its layout. The initial scribe's method involved writing the text first and then allocating the remaining space for decoration. Additionally, this scribe opted for each book to commence at the start of a new folio. In contrast, the second scribe diverged from this layout approach, opting for minimal breaks between text, even omitting delineations for the beginning of new books as the first scribe had done. Consequently, the section of the Maidstone volume written by the second scribe appears significantly denser and more crowded in comparison.

=== Illuminated Miniatures ===
In the Lambeth volume, the entire Octateuch and the four books of Kings contain illuminated miniatures, excluding Exodus and Leviticus. In the Maidstone volume, illustrations were planned for the beginnings of nearly all the books of the Old Testament. However, in the New Testament section of the Maidstone volume, illustrations were only planned for the first two Gospels, after which pictorial elements were omitted for the remainder of the volume.

=== Historiated Initials ===
Both of the Lambeth Bible volumes include historiated illuminated initials. These historiated initials only appear at the beginning of each biblical book, depicting either the author of the text or the central figure of the events described within. This practice was a tradition that was common in illuminated Bibles of the 11th and 12th centuries. However, in the Maidstone volume, this tradition halts abruptly. Instead, simpler arabesque initials are employed from the Acts of the Apostles onward.

Typically, these figures are represented within these historiated initials through one of three methods: seated upon the letter's form, integrated into the inner space of the letter, or substituting parts of the letter's structure.

=== Scripts ===
The Lambeth Bible is written in a pre-Gothic style of script known as littera minuscula protogothica textualis libraria formata, which is characterized as a sizable, rounded script with vertical characters that is typical of the prominent Bibles and Psalters from the 12th century. Based on the handwriting present in the Bible, it is generally thought that both the Lambeth volume and a significant portion of the Maidstone volume were written by a single scribe. However, starting from folio 197r of the Maidstone volume, a completely new and distinct handwriting emerges, persisting throughout the rest of the Bible. This suggests that two distinct scribes were involved in the writing of the Lambeth Bible.

=== Repairs, Restoration, and Additions ===
During the latter half of the 15th century, repairs were carried out on both volumes. Additional supply leaves were inserted into the Maidstone volume, and both were subsequently rebound using bindings crafted from white goat-skin and wooden boards. During the 1600s, the Lambeth volume had the Archiepiscopal arms of the Archbishop of Canterbury stamped at the center of its cover. The new bindings added in the 15th century during the rebind of the Bible are nearly indistinguishable from one another. It seems that originally, each volume was secured with a set of metal clasps, which are now absent. Both the front and back covers feature panels with diagonal lines, forming diamond-shaped sections where subtle designs are lightly etched.

== Iconography ==
=== Byzantine Influence ===
The Lambeth Bible is indirectly shaped by Byzantine influence, inherited from its major influence, the Bury Bible, which was itself directly influenced by Byzantine style. The influence of Byzantine art can be seen in the iconography of many of the illustrations contained within the Lambeth Bible, such as the illustration of the book of Genesis on folio six. Rather than adhering to traditional Byzantine iconography, the scene depicted in folio six much more closely aligns with the contemporaneous 12th-century Byzantine iconography. This is apparent in the fusion of two narratives from Jacob's story depicted in the illustration. In this portrayal, Jacob is depicted both dreaming, witnessing a ladder encircled by angels ascending towards God offering a scroll, and awake, anointing oil onto the stone that served as his pillow. While in traditional Byzantine iconography these scenes are distinct, the amalgamation of these narratives mirrors the iconography found in 12th-century Byzantine art, exemplified by the mosaics in Palermo and Monreale.

The Byzantine influence seen in the Bury Bible, and consequently in the Lambeth Bible, is thought to have potentially arisen from the inundation of Byzantine art brought to England during the mid-12th century, spurred by the Second Crusade.

=== The Genesis Miniature ===
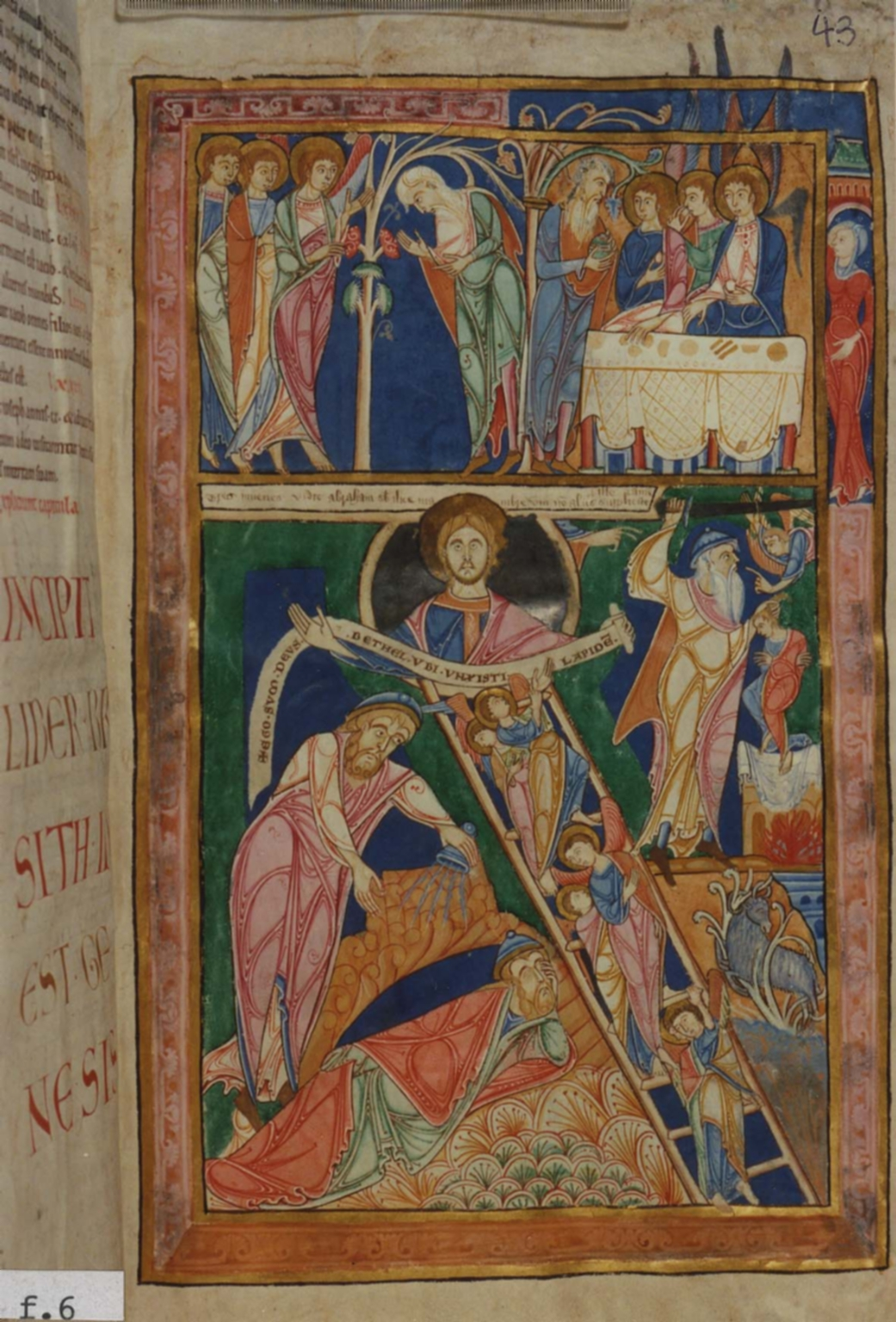
Genesis Frontispiece, illumination on f. 6r

The Lambeth Bible pays special attention to the book of Genesis, as is indicated by the inclusion of both a full-page illuminated miniature and a historiated initial at the beginning of the book. The miniature illustrates three events from the lives of Abraham, Isaac, and Jacob. It is noteworthy that the scenes depicted here were rarely used to illustrate the book of Genesis in the giant Romanesque Bibles. The illustration is divided into two main sections by a border. The top section depicts Abraham's philoxenia, also known as the Hospitality of Abraham, where three angels visit Abraham and Sarah. In the bottom section, the author portrays Jacob's Dream with the ladder to heaven running diagonally across the picture plane, dividing the bottom section into two subsections. In the bottom left corner, Jacob is shown anointing the stone above a second image of him falling asleep, next to which Jacob's ladder divides the picture plane. On the other side of the ladder, in the top right corner, the Sacrifice of Isaac is depicted. The iconography of each biblical scene depicted within the Genesis miniature provides insight into the iconographical sources used for the illumination of the Lambeth Bible.

==== The Philoxenia of Abraham ====
In the top section of the image, the story of the Philoxenia of Abraham, also known as the Hospitality of Abraham, is portrayed and is divided into two scenes by the tree of Mamre in the center. The story of the Philoxenia of Abraham comes from the book of Genesis 18:1-18, which describes Abraham's hospitality to the Lord when he appeared under the tree of Mamre in the form of three angels. In the first scene, Abraham welcomes the three angels beneath the tree of Mamre. In the second scene, Abraham is shown hosting the three angels around a table with food set out; Sarah is depicted in the border to the right of the scene, observing the unfolding events. Many elements found in the Lambeth Bible's portrayal of the Philoxenia of Abraham are shared with other portrayls of the scene from the High Middle Ages, such as the illustrations from the preface of Prudentius's Psychomachia and the Halberstadt Abraham's Carpet, also known as the Halberstadt Abraham's tapestry. These common elements include depicting the three men as angels, featuring the tree of Mamre, and including Sarah in the scene.

==== The Sacrifice of Isaac ====
In the top right corner of the bottom section of the image, the Sacrifice of Isaac is depicted. As described in the accompanying text, Abraham is shown raising his sword high above his son Isaac, who is positioned on the altar, ready for sacrifice. An angel intervenes, emerging from the right and grasping the sword to prevent Abraham from sacrificing Isaac. Two significant iconographic elements stand out in this scene. First, the presence of an altar cloth on the altar where Isaac stands is unusual and not explicitly mentioned in the accompanying text. Instances of this depiction are only known in the Aelfric paraphrase from Canterbury, the Genesis initial of the Winchester Bible, the Munich Psalter, and the York Psalter. Second, the inclusion of a gray step-like structure leading up to the altar on the right side of the scene is unique to the Lambeth Bible and has not been observed elsewhere.

==== Jacob's Dream ====
The main focus of the illustration is on Jacob's dream of the ladder to heaven and the subsequent anointing of the stone the next morning. In the bottom right corner, Jacob is depicted asleep, and directly above him, he is shown anointing the stone in the morning. Jacob and Abraham are both depicted wearing pointed hats, which were commonly used in medieval art to indicate that a figure is Jewish. The ladder extends diagonally across the picture, leading to a bust image of God holding a scroll. This arrangement of the ladder and Jacob sleeping underneath it is a common pictorial scheme for the scene, found in the Ripoll Bible, and the depiction of the ladder to heaven in the nave mosaics of the Capella Palatina in Palermo closely resembles the Lambeth Bible in its composition of this scene.

== See also ==
- Winchester Bible
- Bury Bible
- Dodwell, C. R. (Charles Reginald). 1959. The Great Lambeth Bible. With Introd. and Notes by C.R. Dodwell. New York: T. Yoseloff.
- Calkins, Robert G. 1989. “Additional Lacunae in the Lambeth Bible.” Gesta (Fort Tryon Park, N.Y.) 28 (2): 127–29.
- Denny, Don. 1977. “Notes on the Lambeth Bible.” Gesta (Fort Tryon Park, N.Y.) 16 (2): 51–64.
- Palmer, Richard (Curator), and Michelle Brown. 2010. Lambeth Palace Library: Treasures from the Collection of the Archbishops of Canterbury. London: Scala Publishers Ltd.
- Riedmaier, Josef. 1994. “Die ‘Lambeth-Bibel’: Struktur und Bildaussage einer englischen Bibelhandschrift des 12. Jahrhunderts.” Frankfurt am Main [etc.]: P. Lang.
- Shepard, D. M. (1993). The Lambeth Bible: A textual and iconographic study (Order No. 9622457). Available from ProQuest Dissertations & Theses Global: The Humanities and Social Sciences Collection.
- Dorothy Shepard: Introducing the Lambeth Bible: a Study of Text and Imagery. 2007 ISBN 2-503-51511-8
- Richard Palmer, Michelle P. Brown (eds): Lambeth Palace Library: Treasures from the Collections of the Archbishops of Canterbury. 2010. ISBN 1-85759-627-7
- Christopher de Hamel: Lecture at Lambeth Palace, 19 June 2010.
