= List of Romanesque artists =

This is a list of artists active within the Romanesque period of Western Art. As biographical information often is scarce about artists from this age, many are anonymous or known only by later notnames.

== Architects and stonemasons ==
- Buscheto
- Diotisalvi
- Hézelon de Liège
- Lanfranco
- Ramon Llambard
- Maginardo
- Master Mateo
- Rainaldo

== Goldsmiths and metalworkers ==
- Hugo d'Oignies (before 1187–c. 1240)
- Roger of Helmarshausen (floruit 12th century)
- Renier de Huy (fl. 12th century)
- Nicholas of Verdun (1130–1205)

== Illuminators ==
- Claricia (fl. 13th century)
- Dunstan (909–988)
- Ende (10th century)
- Guda (fl. 12th century)
- Herrad of Landsberg (c. 1130–July 25, 1195)
- Master Hugo (fl. c. 1130 – c. 1150)
- Master of the Registrum Gregorii (10th century)
- Spearhafoc (11th century)

== Painters ==
- Berlinghiero Berlinghieri (fl. 1228–before 1236)
- Lucchese School (11th & 12th centuries)
- Master of Pedret (fl. early 12th century)
- Master of Taüll (fl. 12th century)
- Notker Physicus (died 975)

== Sculptors ==
- Arnau Cadell (fl. 12th–13th century)
- Benedetto Antelami (c. 1150 – c. 1230)
- Gislebertus (fl. 12th century)
- Hegvald (fl. c. 1175–1200)
- Horder (fl. 12th century)
- Master of Cabestany (fl. second half of the 12th century)
- Byzantios (fl. c. 1175–1200)
- Majestatis (fl. second half of the 12th century)
- Master Mateo (c. 1150–c. 1200 or c. 1217)
- Sigraf (fl. c. 1175–1210)
- Othelric (fl. c. 1180)
- Radovan (fl. 13th century)
- Tove (fl. around 1191)
- Vgo (fl. 12th century)
- Wiligelmo (fl. c. 1099–1120)
- Calcarius (fl. second quarter of the 13th century)
