= Bury Bible =

Illustrated Bible by Master Hugo

The Bury Bible is a large illustrated bible written at Bury St Edmunds in Suffolk, England between 1121 and 1148. The book was created by an artist known as Master Hugo and is the only surviving major work of his. Since 1575 it has been in the Parker Library of Corpus Christi College, Cambridge, with the shelf-mark Cambridge CCCC M 2.

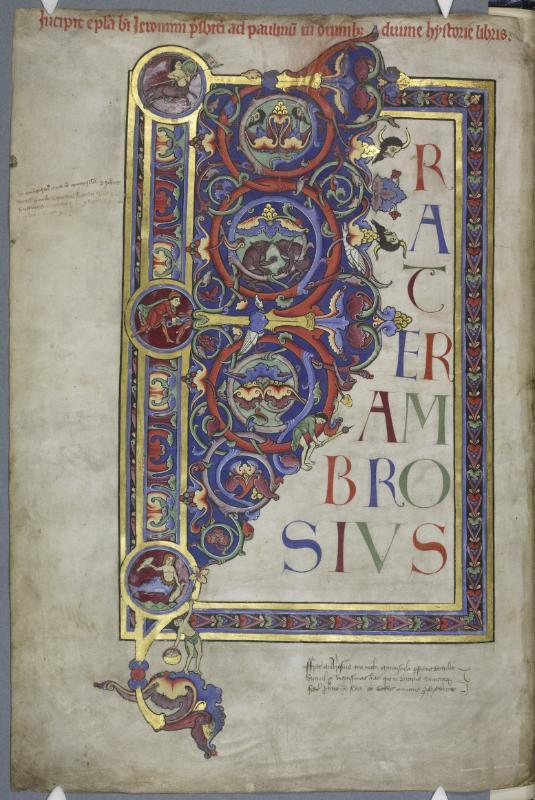
Bury Bible - F1v - Frater Ambrosius

It is an important example of Romanesque illumination from Norman England, and bears comparison with other large bibles produced in England in the 12th century such as the Dover Bible, Lambeth Bible, Rochester Bible, and the Winchester Bible.

== Description ==
The Bury Bible is bound in three volumes and while it used to be a single volume, only the first part of the original two-volume work has been preserved. Twelve pictures were painted on parchment of vellum bought from Ireland on separate pages and then incorporated into the work; six remain. 42 of the original 44 painted initials have been preserved.

The preserved portion of the Bible is bound in 3 volumes, with dimensions 52.2 cm high by 36 cm wide. Though the book used to be a single volume. They contain 357 folios in total.

The books illuminated artwork and initials are painted on vellum that is separate from the page and was stuck to it with an adhesive. This was said Master Hugo was ‘unable to find any suitable calf-hide in these parts’ and thus the parchment was purchased from Ireland.

Six pages originally prefaced the book, but had been removed from the book and are unfortunately lost now.

== Inspiration ==
Master Hugo was influenced by Byzantine paintings and resemblance in his style has been compared to the Asinou in Cyprus. The first illuminated page contains colors of crimson and various shades of sapphire as well as gold encasing people and mythical creatures such as mermaids, imps, and centaurs as well as various birds and plants. The animals and people are ringed by gold on the outer left side and the center rings the imps and men with abstracted bodies. The faces were modeled ad shaded in green and gray and folds were divided into sections to show limbs. This style of folding is called ‘damp-fold’ and abstractions like this is not uncommon throughout the book. As the art shapes elegantly into the right side of the page, green vines border it and painted letters sit in a negative space. The image is half bordered by a square while the looping shapes take up the other portion.

The next page after that contains painted letter and beside that a column of the traditional writing that is in most illuminated manuscript. The language in the Bury Bible is that of Latin and Middle English (1100-1500). Most of the book is done with the traditional columns.

== Images ==
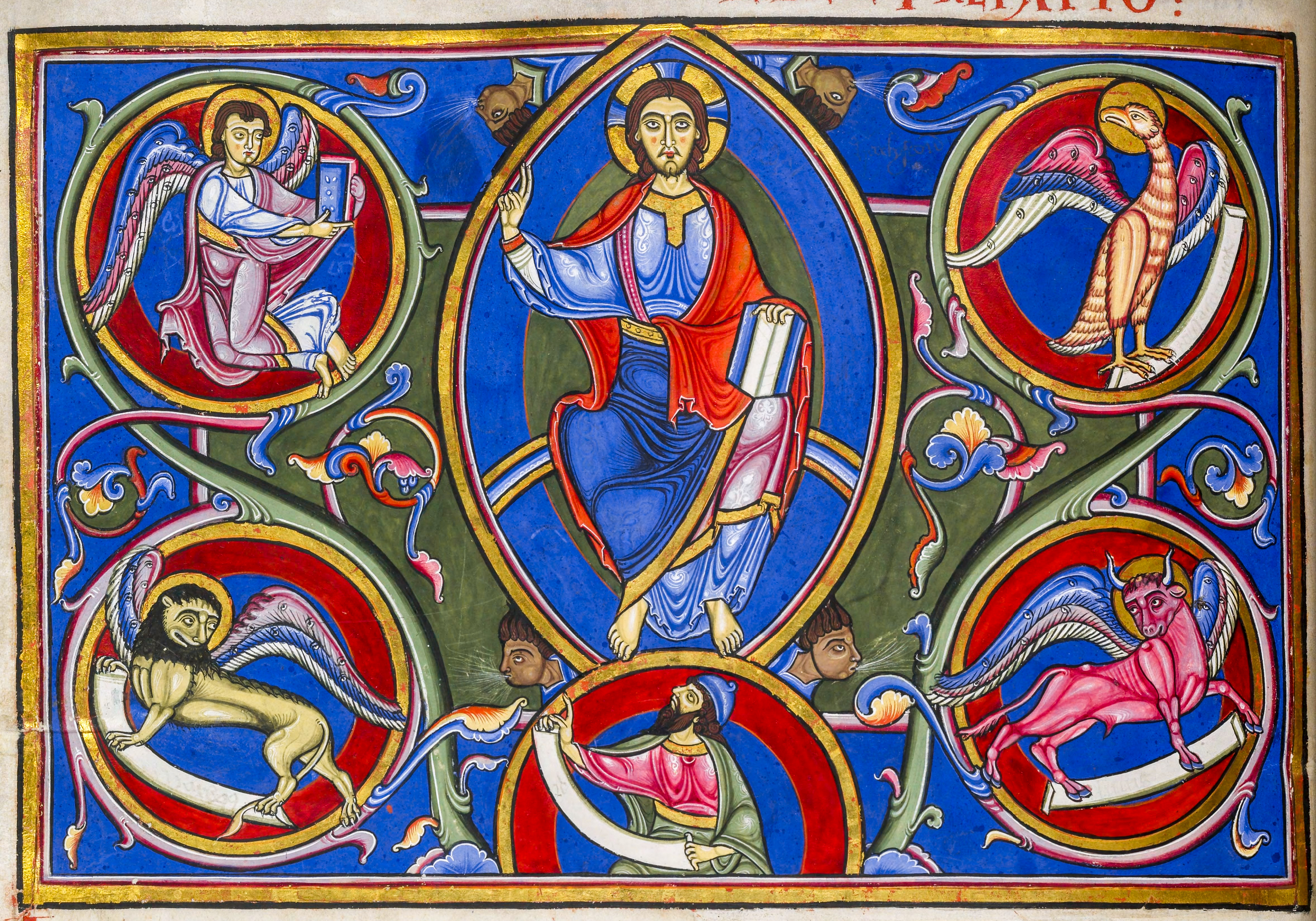
Cambridge, Corpus Christi College, MS 002 (3). The Bury Bible, fol. 281v. Vision of Ezekiel

The majority of the imagery in the Bury Bible are of letters. Calligraphy is the highlight of this particular piece. Capital letters starting new paragraphs are brightly colored in red, blue, and green and are noticeable among the columns. Occasionally there is gold leaf and intricate details for a particular letter that starts a new segment of information.

While the Bury Bible is mostly text and calligraphy, there are several images. The first image and halfway through the book, gold leaf lettering of figures with halos around their heads speaking messages. Animals rarely appear in the Bury Bible as the focus is on saints and holy figures preaching their messages to other people.

The image shown to the right, which is titled, "Vision of Ezekiel", is one of the few images that use animals. This image is also a great example of what the imagery in the Bury Bible holds. Brightly colored with blue, red highlighting circular orbs that encase the figures and animals and gold leaf outlines with different shades of green as a backdrop for the image, a holy figure sits in the center, a halo around his head. The gold trimmings around the middle figure are almond shaped and represent a full body halo, which was a symbol of Christ. Five figures sit adjacent to the middle figure. To the left side, a winged angel holds a square object in a strange position, legs facing away, but upper half facing towards the figure. A bird is parallel of the angel, colored with rare whites and oranges. Beneath the angel is a griffon holding a scroll and parallel to that figure is a red bull, also winged and bearing a halo. Directly beneath the figure is a saint, which connects all figures with a scroll, likely representing the Bury Bible itself, however noticeably this figure lacks a halo around their head, being the only whole figure to lack one. Figures blow wind from their mouths at the corners of the main figure, skin a bronze color and only their profiles are visible. Red, blue and green vines entangle the image all around.

Master Hugo 'The Bury St Edmunds Bible' (c.1135)

The blue is particularly rich and boarders the image while the red draws the eye towards the animals and saintly figures. The gold leaf is used to accent the page and the greens are shaded delicately to give depth and dimension to the vines.

The green backdrop at first seems to fade into the background, however it is necessary for this piece, as it is filling negative space with its rich color. Should the image have been left white or bare, the colors wouldn't have stood out the way that they do.

Another image the bible shows has an intricate boarder around it and shows two figures with halos around their heads preaching to a crowd of people on the upper panel. Green and blue are used to portray an open field and white birds are in the background of the lower panel.

== Artist: Master Hugo ==
Master Hugh or Hugo is the only known name of the artist. He was a lay artist and commissioned at Bury alone to make many different media works. Among his works he made bronze doors, bells, and crosses, which are all lost. The Bury Bible is the only work of his to have existed and it's only part one of a two volume set. His work has strong Byzantine influence as he uses green-gray shades for skin tones and the frames and illuminated letters swirl with Italianate plants. Not to mention his 'damp-fold' style in the drapery of the book itself.

Master Hugo disliked the quality of the local parchment and ordered higher quality from Ireland for the illuminations and pasted them into the pages.
