= Othelric =

Romanesque stone sculptor

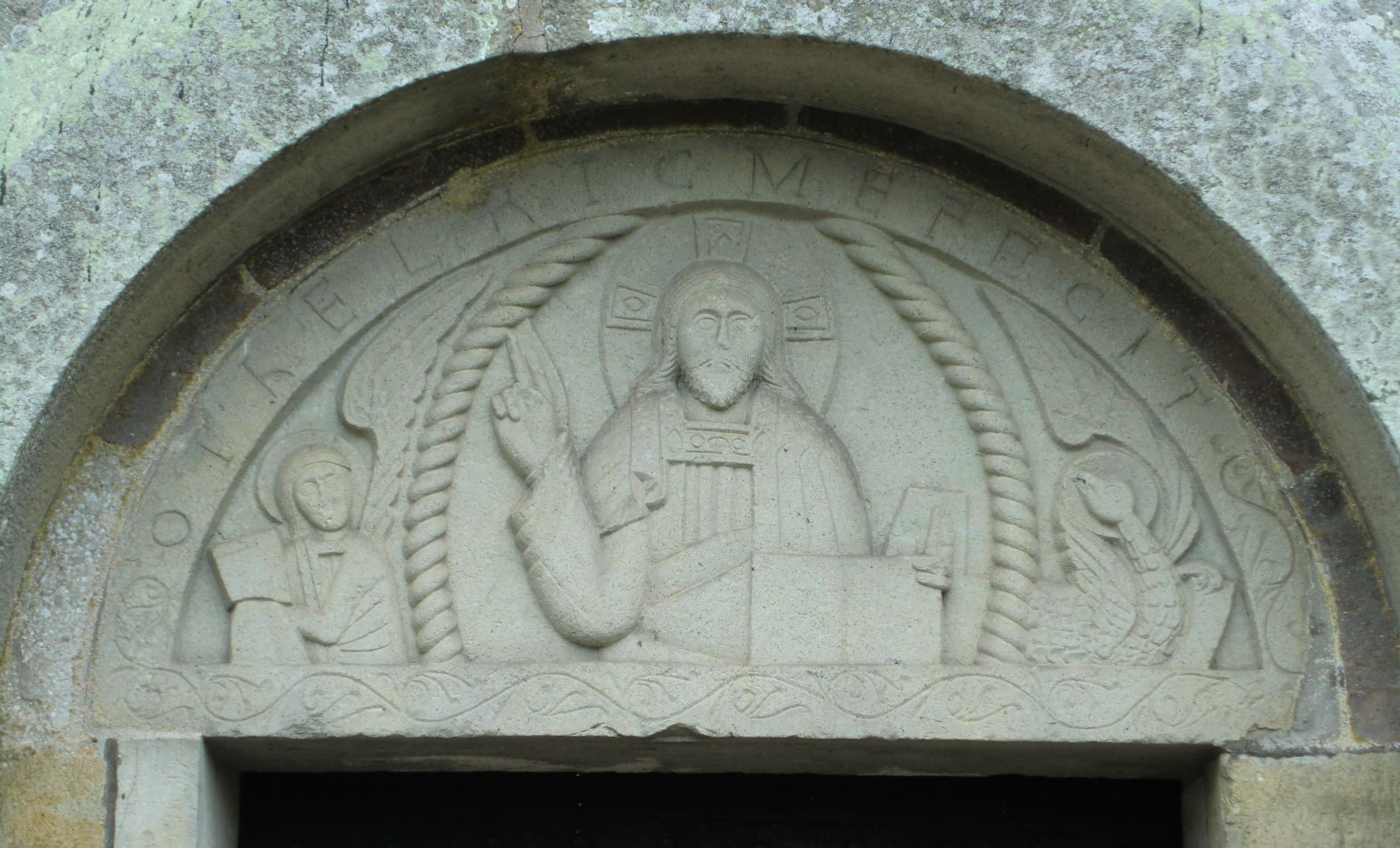
The tympanum at Skälvum Church, signed Othelric me fecit (i.e., Othelric made me) by the sculptor

Othelric (fl. ca. 1180) was a Romanesque stone sculptor, working in Västergötland, present-day Sweden.

== Life and works ==
Very little is known about who this stone sculptor was. His name is derived from a signed tympanum at Skälvum Church in Västergötland, where the sculptor has written his name in Latin. Scholars have speculated that he might have been of English ancestry, but later research point to that he more probably came from Westphalia in present-day Germany. Quite possible, he came to Sweden via Lund, where the construction of the Lund Cathedral attracted many foreign artists. It is known that the Bishop of Skara visited the construction site at the time, and may possibly have initiated a contact.

Two churches in Västergötland have been attributed to Othelric, probably being designed in their entirety by the artist: Skälvum Church and Kinne-Vedum Church. Apart from the churches and their sculpted decoration, the baptismal font and altar front in Skälvum are also attributed to Othelric, as have an additional six baptismal fonts in Västergötland. A grave monument in Hällstad Church is also considered to be by his hand or design.

Stylistically, Othelric seems to have taken inspiration from contemporary illuminated manuscripts and metalwork, and executed the sculptures with precision and rendered them rounded and unobstructed. At least some of his sculptures were originally painted.

== Gallery ==
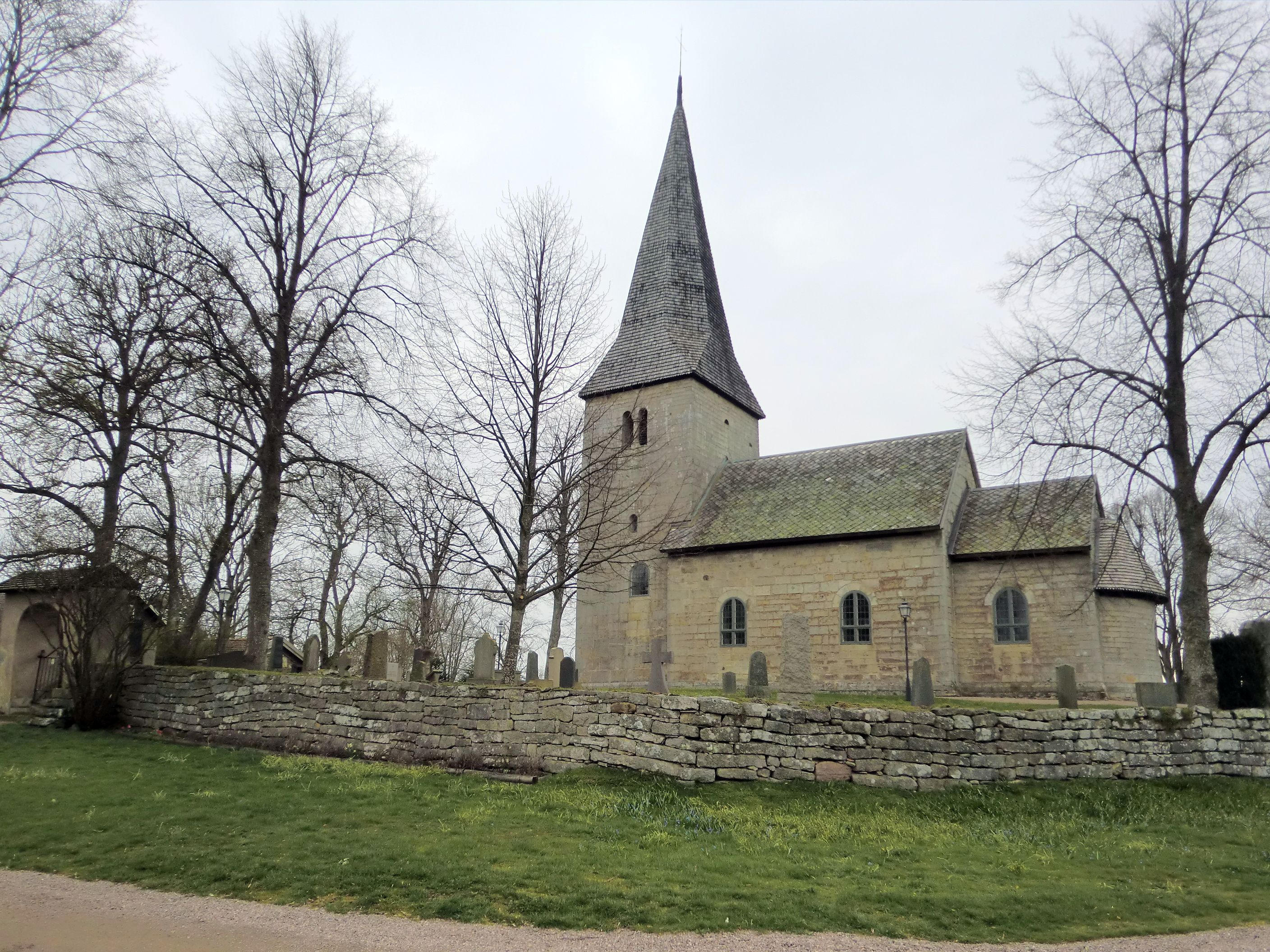
Skälvum Church

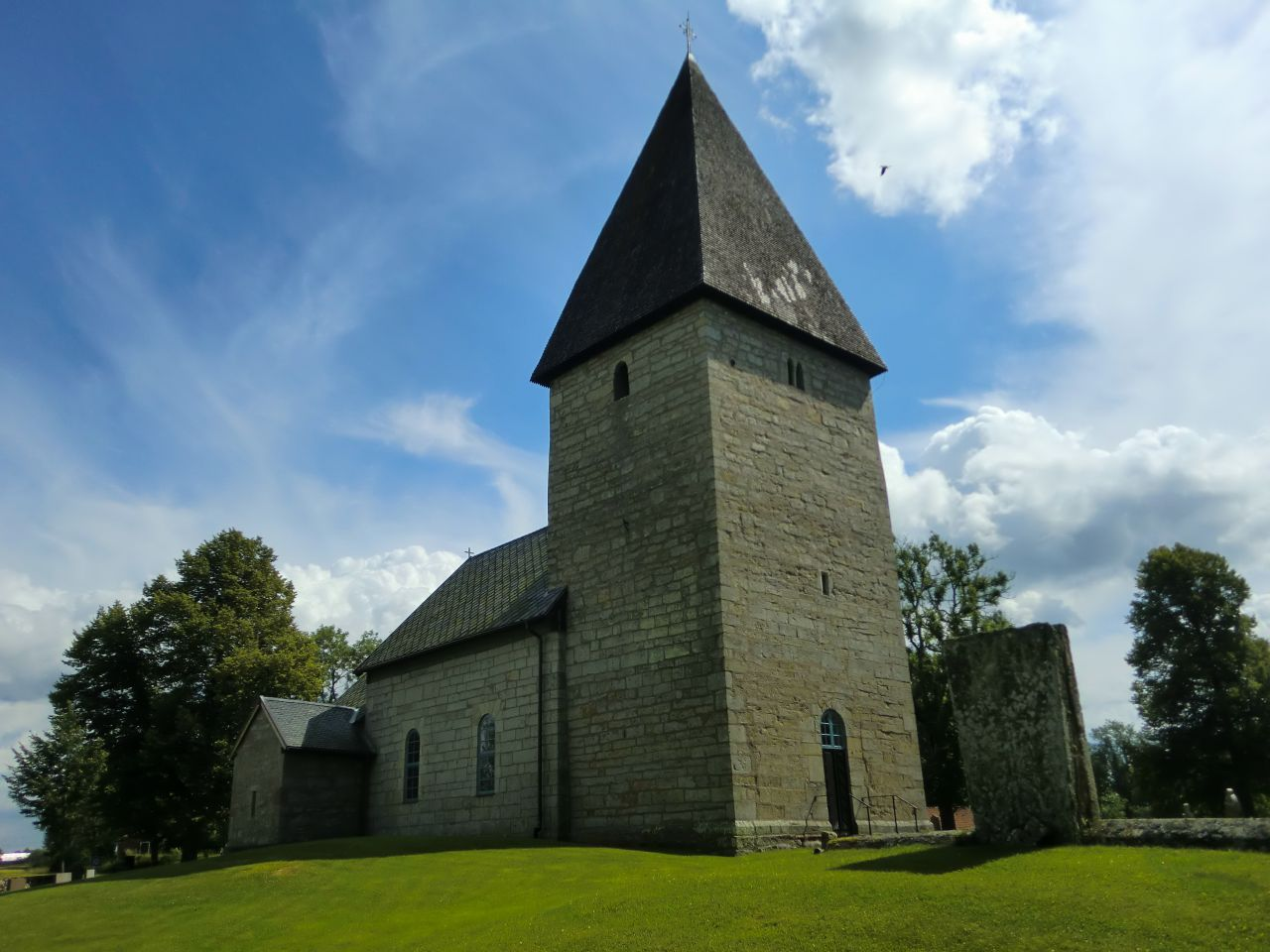
Kinne-Vedum Church

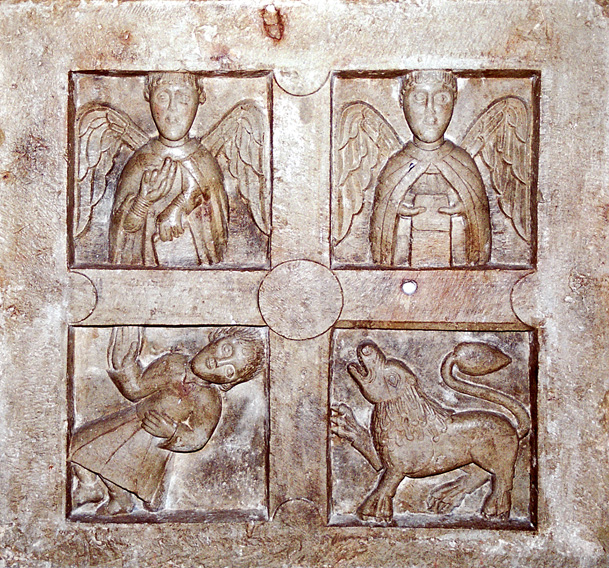
Detail of the altar front in Skälvum Church
