= Romanesque art =

Artistic style of Europe from 1000 AD to the 13c

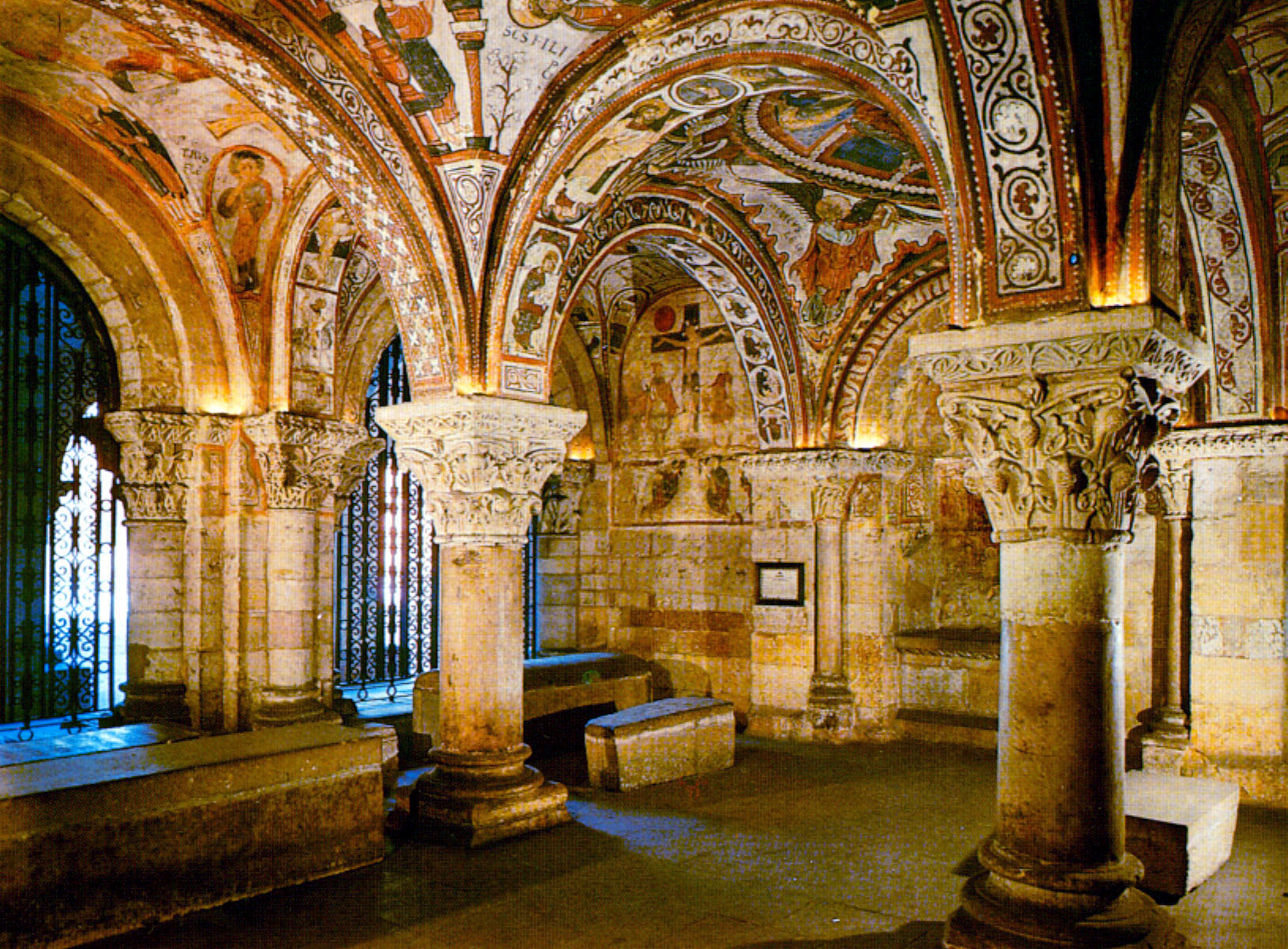
The painted crypt of San Isidoro at León, Spain

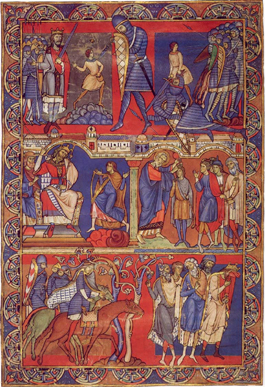
The "Morgan Leaf", detached from the Winchester Bible of 1160–75. Scenes from the life of David.

Romanesque art is the art of Europe from approximately 1000 AD to the rise of the Gothic style in the 12th century, or later depending on region. The preceding period is known as the Pre-Romanesque period. The term was invented by 19th-century art historians, especially for Romanesque architecture, which retained many basic features of Roman architectural style – most notably round-headed arches, but also barrel vaults, apses, and acanthus-leaf decoration – but had also developed many very different characteristics.

In southern France, Spain, and Italy there was an architectural continuity with the Late Antique, but the Romanesque style was the first style to spread across the whole of Catholic Europe, from Sicily to Scandinavia. Romanesque art was also greatly influenced by Byzantine art, especially in painting, and by the anti-classical energy of the decoration of the Insular art of the British Isles. From these elements was forged a highly innovative and coherent style.

== Characteristics ==
Outside Romanesque architecture, the art of the period was characterised by a vigorous style in both sculpture and painting. The latter continued to follow essentially Byzantine iconographic models for the most common subjects in churches, which remained Christ in Majesty, the Last Judgment, and scenes from the life of Christ. In illuminated manuscripts more originality is seen, as new scenes needed to be depicted. The most lavishly decorated manuscripts of this period were bibles and psalters. The same originality applied to the capitals of columns, which were often carved with complete scenes with several figures. The large wooden crucifix was a German innovation at the very start of the period, as were free-standing statues of the enthroned Madonna. High relief was the dominant sculptural mode of the period.

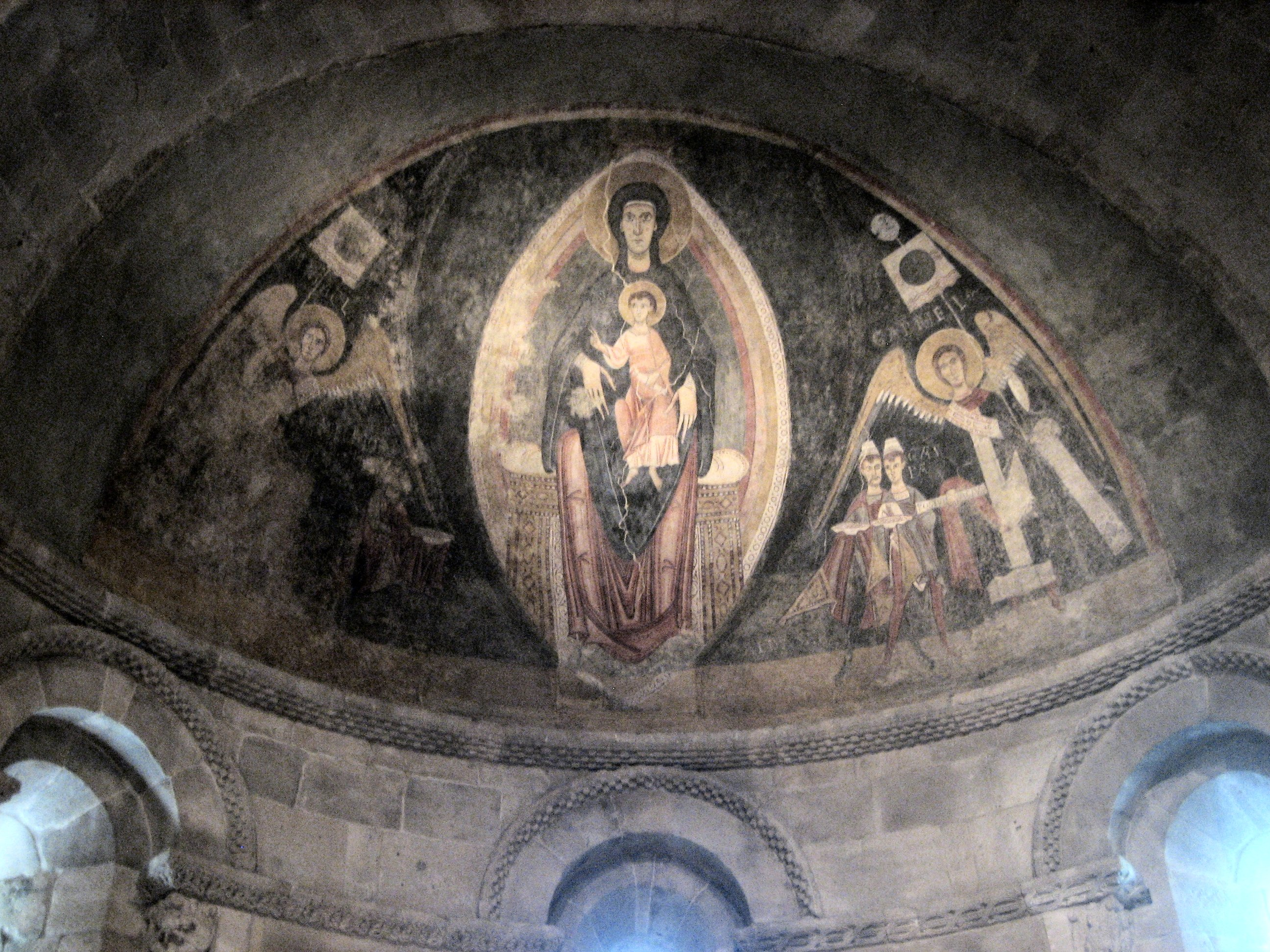
Master of Pedret, The Virgin and Child in Majesty and the Adoration of the Magi, apse fresco from Tredòs, Val d'Aran, Catalonia, Spain, c. 1100, now at The Cloisters in New York City.

Colours were very striking, and mostly primary. Presently, these colours can typically only be seen in their original vividness in samples of stained glass and well-preserved manuscripts. Stained glass became widely used, although few survive today. In an invention of the period, the tympanums of important church portals were carved with monumental schemes, often Christ in Majesty or the Last Judgement, but treated with more freedom than painted versions, as there were no equivalent Byzantine models.

Compositions usually had little depth and needed to be flexible to be fit into the shapes of historiated initials, column capitals, and church tympanums; the tension between a tightly enclosing frame, from which the composition sometimes escapes, is a recurrent theme in Romanesque art. Figures often varied in size in relation to their importance. Landscape backgrounds, if employed at all, were closer to abstract decorations than realism – as in the trees in the "Morgan Leaf". Portraiture hardly existed.

== Background ==
During this period, Europe grew steadily more prosperous, and art of the highest quality was no longer confined, as it largely was in the Carolingian and Ottonian periods, to the royal court and a small circle of monasteries. Monasteries continued to be extremely important, especially those of the expansionist new orders of the period, the Cistercian, Cluniac, and Carthusian, which spread across Europe. But city churches, those on pilgrimage routes, and many churches in small towns and villages were elaborately decorated to a very high standard – these are often the structures to have survived, when cathedrals and city churches have been rebuilt. No Romanesque royal palace has really survived.

The lay artist was becoming a valued figure – Nicholas of Verdun seems to have been known across the continent. Most masons and goldsmiths were now lay, and lay painters such as Master Hugo seem to have been in the majority, at least of those doing the best work, by the end of the period. The iconography of their church work was no doubt arrived at in consultation with clerical advisors.

== Sculpture ==
=== Metalwork, enamels, and ivories ===
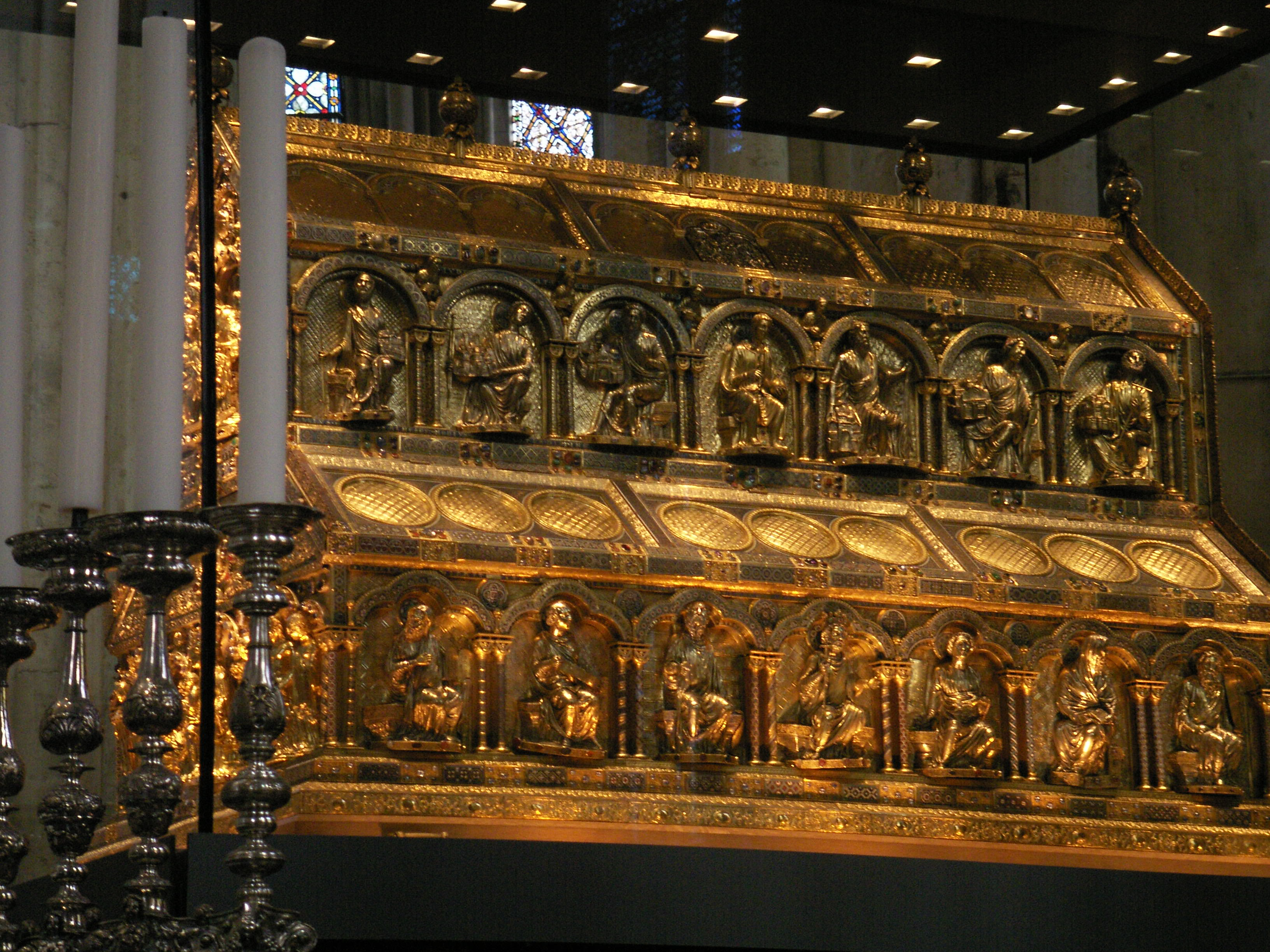
The Shrine of the Three Kings in Cologne Cathedral, Cologne, Germany

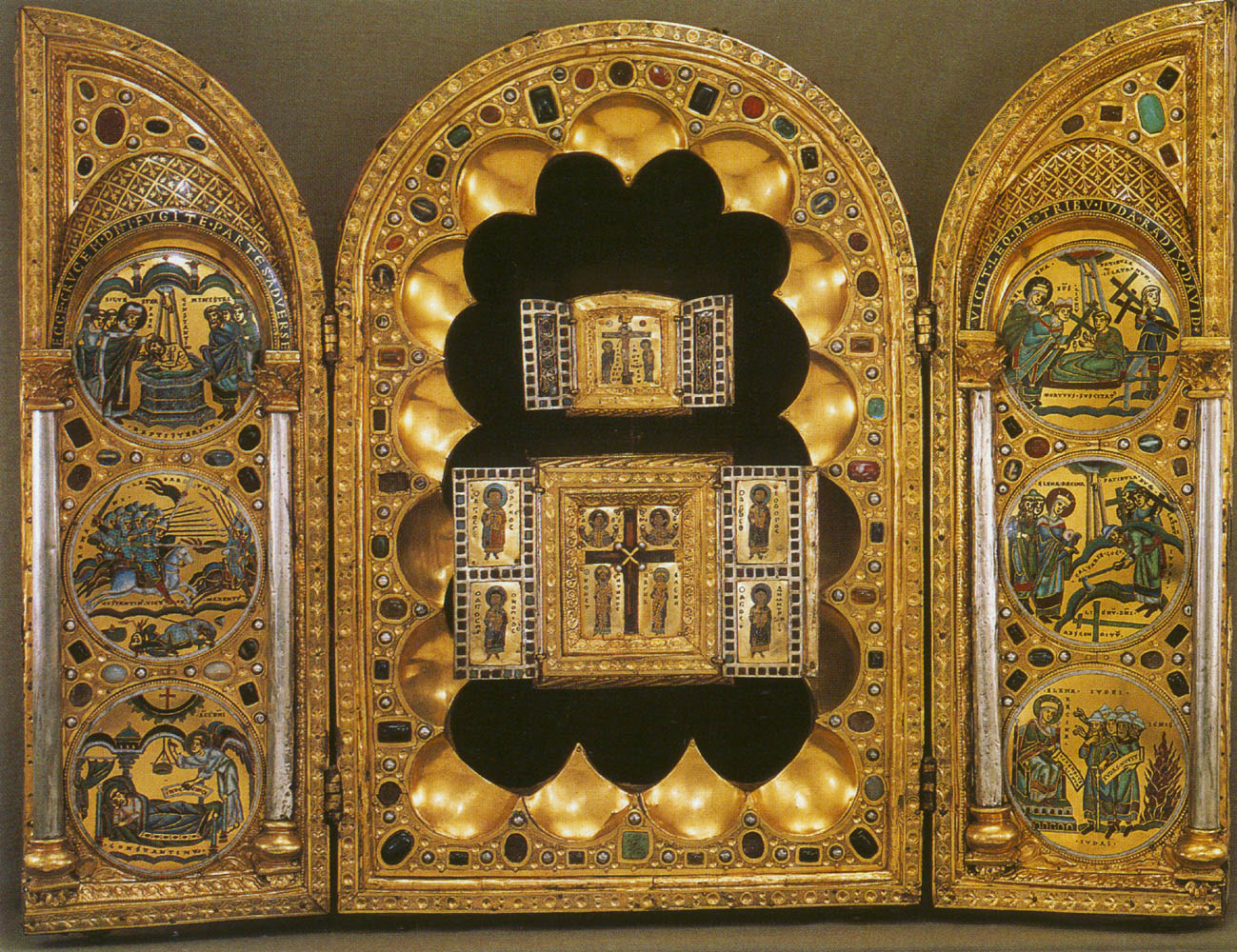
Stavelot Triptych, Mosan, Belgium, c. 1156–1158. 48 × 66 cm with wings open, Morgan Library, New York

Precious objects in these media had a very high status in the period, probably much more so than paintings – the names of more makers of these objects are known than those of contemporary painters, illuminators or architect-masons. Metalwork, including decoration in enamel, became very sophisticated. Many spectacular shrines made to hold relics have survived, of which the best known is the Shrine of the Three Kings at Cologne Cathedral by Nicholas of Verdun and others (c. 1180–1225). The Stavelot Triptych and Reliquary of St. Maurus are other examples of Mosan enamelwork. Large reliquaries and altar frontals were built around a wooden frame, but smaller caskets were all metal and enamel. A few secular pieces, such as mirror cases, jewellery and clasps have survived, but these no doubt under-represent the amount of fine metalwork owned by the nobility.

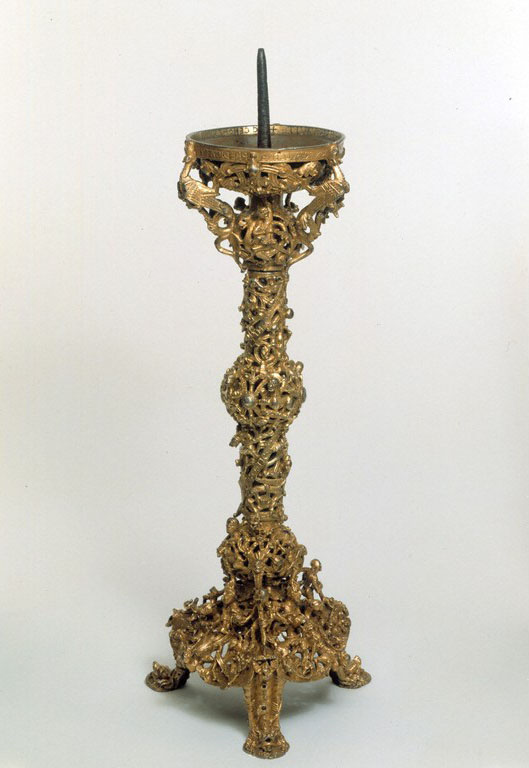
The Gloucester candlestick, early 12th century

The bronze Gloucester candlestick and the brass font of 1108–1117 now in Liège are superb examples, very different in style, of metal casting. The former is highly intricate and energetic, drawing on manuscript painting, while the font shows the Mosan style at its most classical and majestic. The bronze doors, a triumphal column and other fittings at Hildesheim Cathedral, the Gniezno Doors, and the doors of the Basilica di San Zeno in Verona are other substantial survivals. The aquamanile, a container for water to wash with, appears to have been introduced to Europe in the 11th century. Artisans often gave the pieces fantastic zoomorphic forms; surviving examples are mostly in brass. Many wax impressions from impressive seals survive on charters and documents, although Romanesque coins are generally not of great aesthetic interest.

The Cloisters Cross is an unusually large ivory crucifix, with complex carving including many figures of prophets and others, which has been attributed to one of the relatively few artists whose name is known, Master Hugo, who also illuminated manuscripts. Like many pieces it was originally partly coloured. The Lewis chessmen are well-preserved examples of small ivories, of which many pieces or fragments remain from croziers, plaques, pectoral crosses and similar objects.

=== Architectural sculpture ===
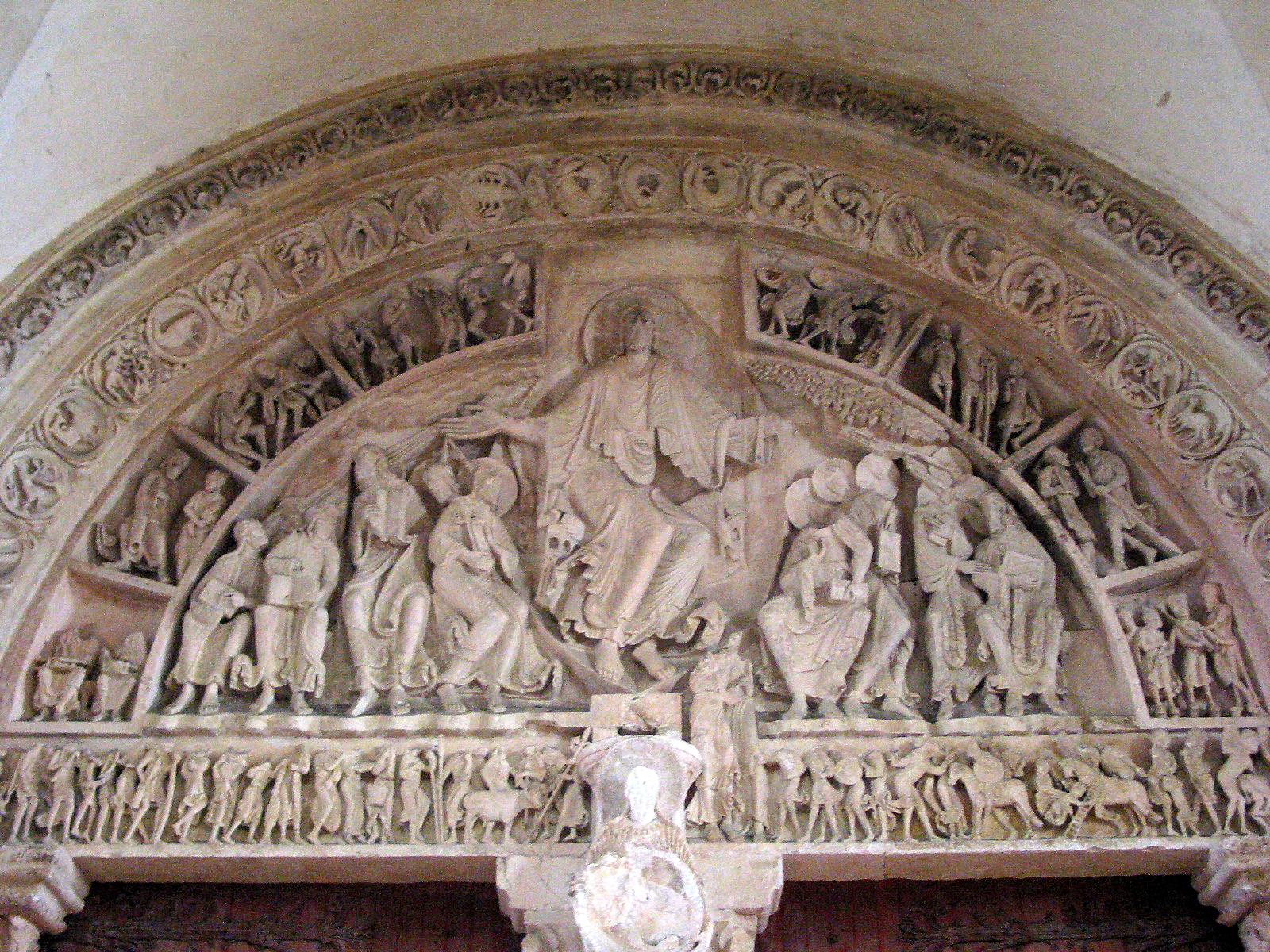
The tympanum of Vézelay Abbey, Burgundy, France, 1130s, has much decorative spiral detail in the draperies.

With the fall of the Western Roman Empire, the tradition of carving large works in stone and sculpting figures in bronze died out, as it effectively did (for religious reasons) in the Byzantine (Eastern Roman) world. Some life-size sculpture was evidently done in stucco or plaster, but surviving examples are understandably rare. The best-known surviving large sculptural work of Proto-Romanesque Europe is the life-size wooden Crucifix commissioned by Archbishop Gero of Cologne in about 960–965, apparently the prototype of what became a popular form. These were later set up on a beam below the chancel arch, known in English as a rood, from the twelfth century accompanied by figures of the Virgin Mary and John the Evangelist to the sides. During the 11th and 12th centuries, figurative sculpture strongly revived, and architectural reliefs are a hallmark of the later Romanesque period.

==== Sources and style ====
Figurative sculpture was based on two other sources in particular, manuscript illumination and small-scale sculpture in ivory and metal. The extensive friezes sculpted on Armenian and Syriac churches have been proposed as another likely influence. These sources together produced a distinct style which can be recognised across Europe, although the most spectacular sculptural projects are concentrated in South-Western France, Northern Spain and Italy.

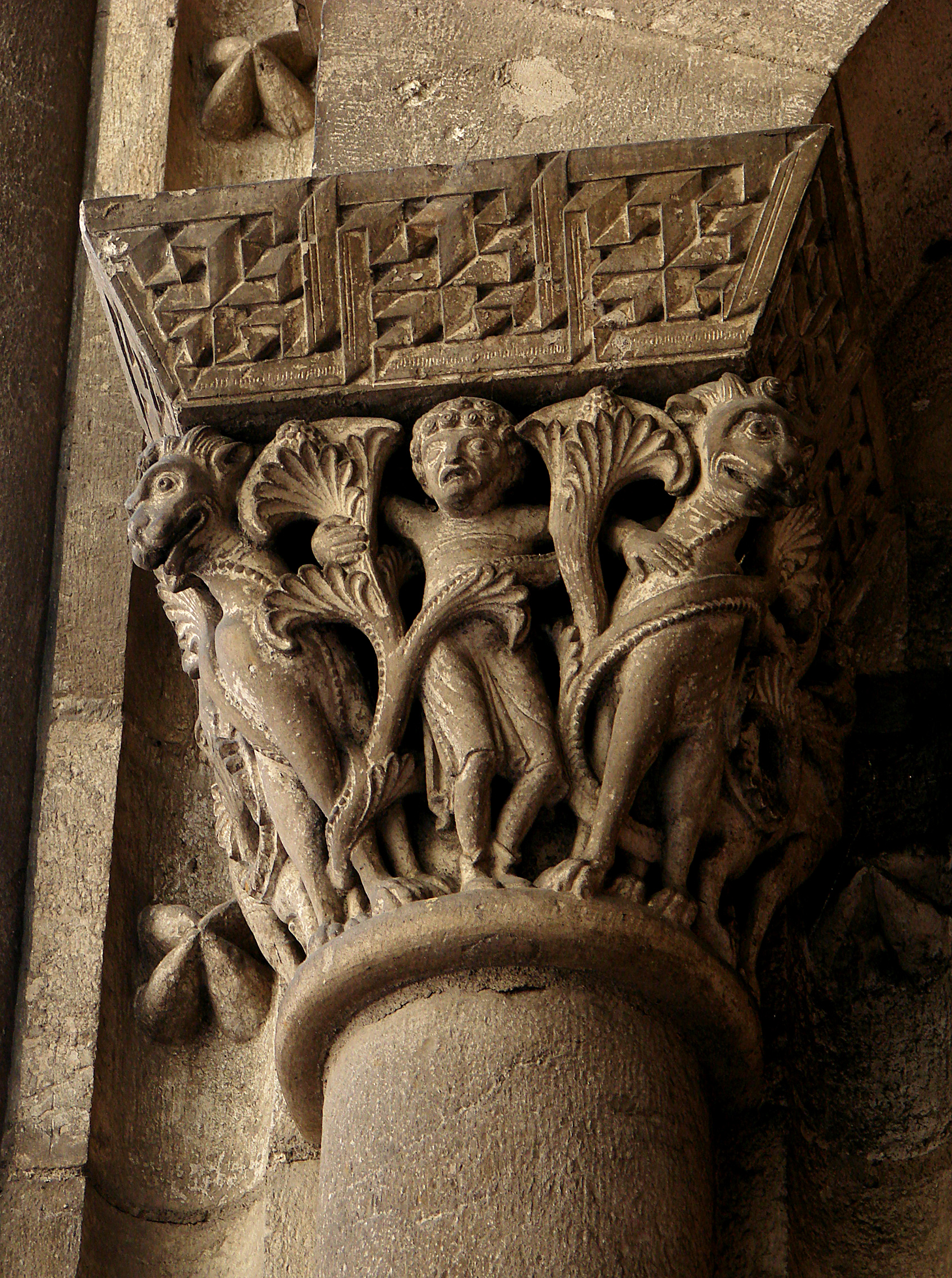
Man and confronted animals, Cahors Cathedral

Images that occurred in metalwork were frequently embossed. The resultant surface had two main planes and details that were usually incised. This treatment was adapted to stone carving and is seen particularly in the tympanum above the portal, where the imagery of Christ in Majesty with the symbols of the Four Evangelists is drawn directly from the gilt covers of medieval Gospel Books. This style of doorway occurs in many places and continued into the Gothic period. A rare survival in England is that of the "Prior's Door" at Ely Cathedral. In South-Western France, many have survived, with impressive examples at Saint-Pierre, Moissac, Souillac, and La Madeleine, Vézelay – all daughter houses of Cluny, with extensive other sculpture remaining in cloisters and other buildings. Nearby, Autun Cathedral has a Last Judgement of great rarity in that it has uniquely been signed by its creator, Giselbertus.

A feature of the figures in manuscript illumination is that they often occupy confined spaces and are contorted to fit. The custom of artists to make the figure fit the available space lent itself to a facility in designing figures to ornament door posts and lintels and other such architectural surfaces. The robes of painted figures were commonly treated in a flat and decorative style that bore little resemblance to the weight and fall of actual cloth. This feature was also adapted for sculpture. Among the many examples that exist, one of the finest is the figure of the Prophet Jeremiah from the pillar of the portal of the Abbey of Saint-Pierre, Moissac, France, from about 1130.

One of the most significant motifs of Romanesque design, occurring in both figurative and non-figurative sculpture is the spiral. One of the sources may be Ionic capitals. Scrolling vines were a common motif of both Byzantine and Roman design, and may be seen in mosaic on the vaults of the 4th century Church of Santa Costanza, Rome. Manuscripts and architectural carvings of the 12th century have very similar scrolling vine motifs.

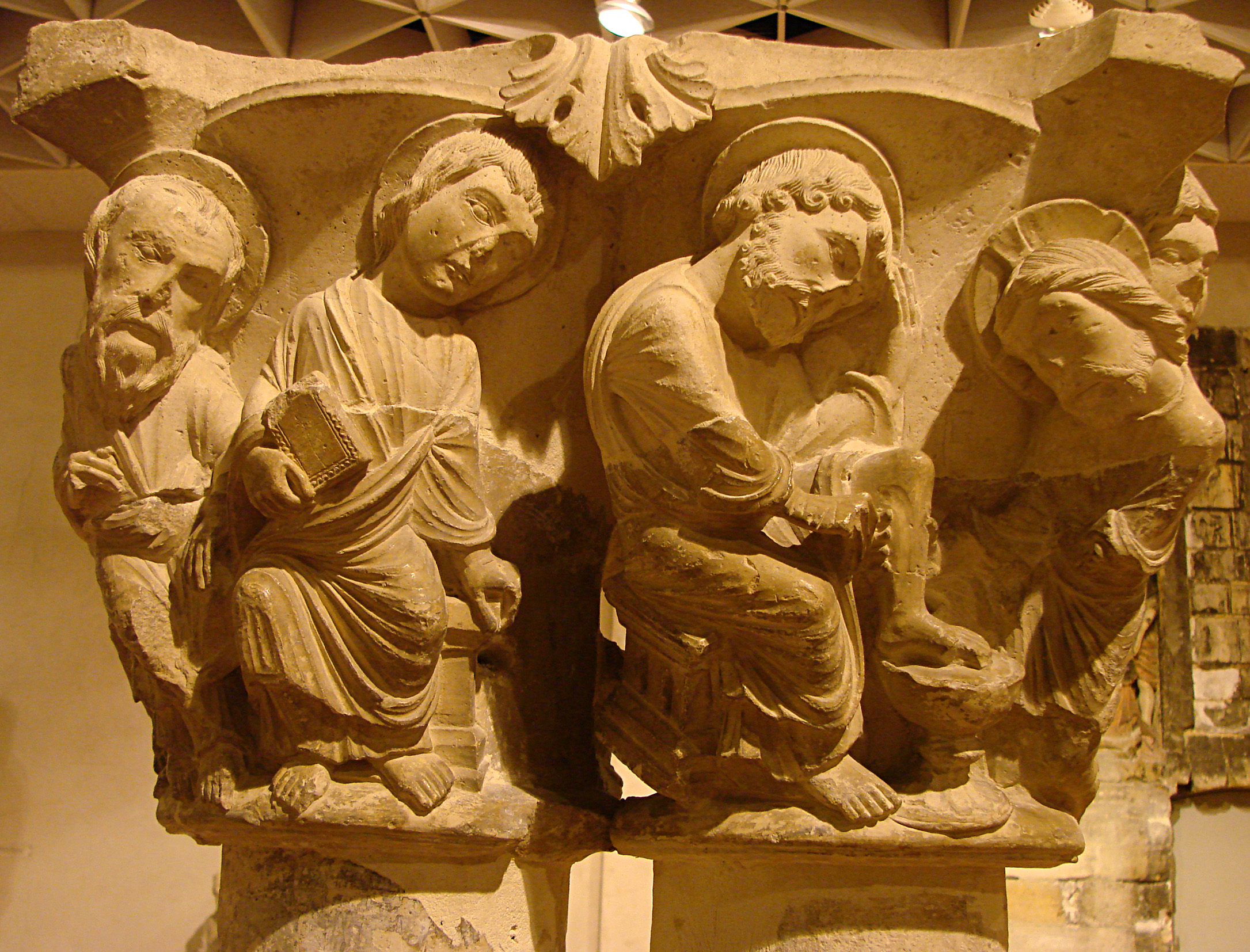
This capital of Christ washing the feet of his Apostles has strong narrative qualities in the interaction of the figures, Châlons-en-Champagne, Notre-Dame-en-Vaux Museum.

Another source of the spiral is clearly the illuminated manuscripts of the 7th to 9th centuries, particularly Irish manuscripts such as the St. Gall Gospel Book, spread into Europe by the Hiberno-Scottish mission. In these illuminations the use of the spiral has nothing to do with vines or other plant forms. The motif is abstract and mathematical. The style was then picked up in Carolingian art and given a more botanical character. It is in an adaptation of this form that the spiral occurs in the draperies of both sculpture and stained glass windows. Of all the many examples that occur on Romanesque portals, one of the most outstanding is that of the central figure of Christ at La Madeleine, Vezelay.

Another influence from Insular art are engaged and entwined animals, often used to superb effect in capitals (as at Silos) and sometimes on a column itself (as at Moissac). Much of the treatment of paired, confronted and entwined animals in Romanesque decoration has similar Insular origins, as do animals whose bodies tail into purely decorative shapes. (Despite the adoption of Hiberno-Saxon traditions into Romanesque styles in England and on the continent, the influence was primarily one-way. Irish art during this period remained isolated, developing a unique amalgam of native Irish and Viking styles which would be slowly extinguished and replaced by mainstream Romanesque style in the early 13th century following the Anglo-Norman invasion of Ireland.)

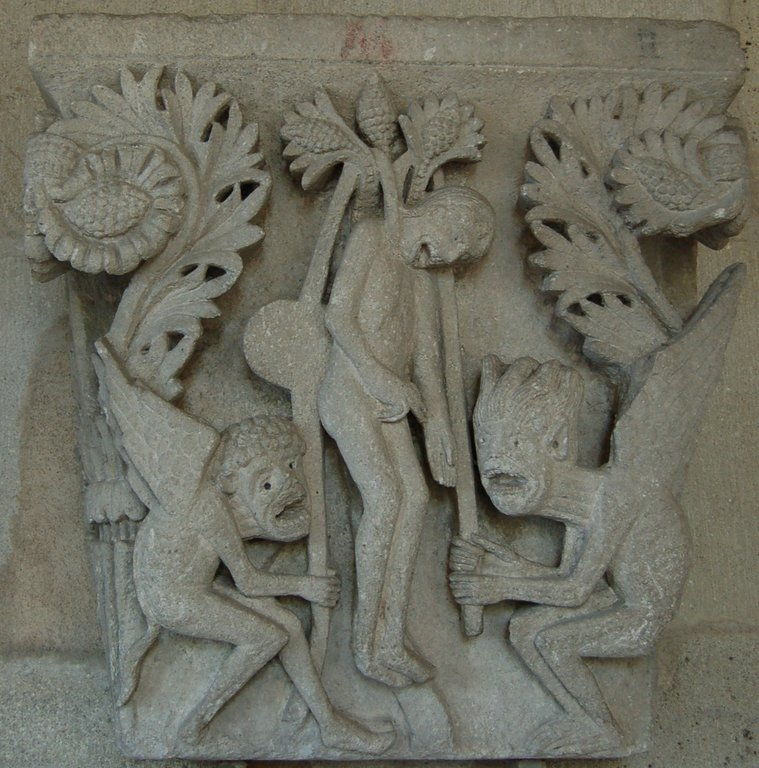
Judas Iscariot hangs himself, assisted by devils, always a favourite subject of carvers, Autun Cathedral

==== Subject matter ====
Most Romanesque sculpture is pictorial and biblical in subject. A great variety of themes are found on capitals and include scenes of Creation and the Fall of Man, episodes from the life of Christ and those Old Testament scenes which prefigure his Death and Resurrection, such as Jonah and the Whale and Daniel in the lions' den. Many Nativity scenes occur, the theme of the Three Kings being particularly popular. The cloisters of Santo Domingo de Silos Abbey in Northern Spain, and Moissac are fine examples surviving complete, as are the relief sculptures on the many Tournai fonts found in churches in southern England, France and Belgium.

A feature of some Romanesque churches is the extensive sculptural scheme which covers the area surrounding the portal or, in some case, much of the facade. Angouleme Cathedral in France has a highly elaborate scheme of sculpture set within the broad niches created by the arcading of the facade. In the Spanish region of Catalonia, an elaborate pictorial scheme in low relief surrounds the door of the church of Santa Maria at Ripoll.

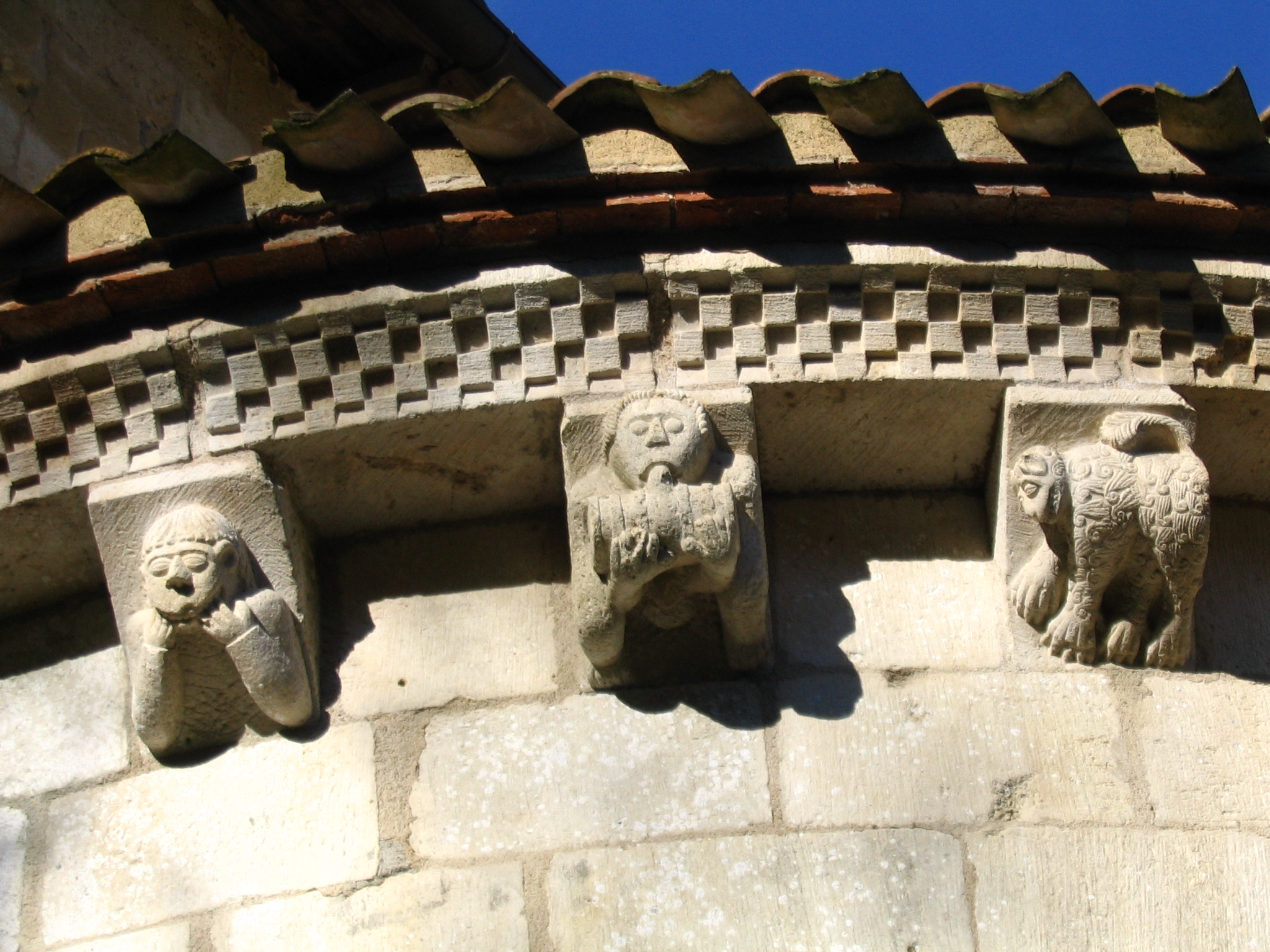
Around the upper wall of the chancel at the Abbaye d'Arthous, Landes, France, are small figures depicting lust, intemperance and a Barbary ape, symbol of human depravity.

The purpose of the sculptural schemes was to convey a message that the Christian believer should recognize wrongdoing, repent and be redeemed. The Last Judgement reminds the believer to repent. The carved or painted Crucifix, displayed prominently within the church, reminds the sinner of redemption.

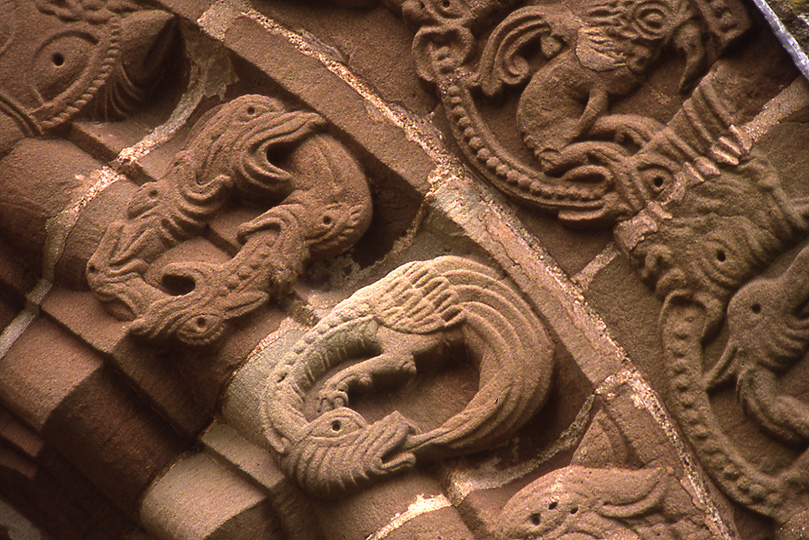
Ouroboros, single and in pairs at Kilpeck, England

Often the sculpture is alarming in form and in subject matter. These works are found on capitals, corbels and bosses, or entwined in the foliage on door mouldings. They represent forms that are not easily recognizable today. Common motifs include Sheela na Gig, fearsome demons, ouroboros or dragons swallowing their tails, and many other mythical creatures with obscure meaning. Spirals and paired motifs originally had special significance in oral tradition that has been lost or rejected by modern scholars.

The Seven Deadly Sins including lust, gluttony and avarice are also frequently represented. The appearance of many figures with oversized genitals can be equated with carnal sin, and so can the numerous figures shown with protruding tongues, which are a feature of the doorway of Lincoln Cathedral. Pulling one's beard was a symbol of masturbation, and pulling one's mouth wide open was also a sign of lewdness. A common theme found on capitals of this period is a tongue poker or beard stroker being beaten by his wife or seized by demons. Demons fighting over the soul of a wrongdoer such as a miser is another popular subject.

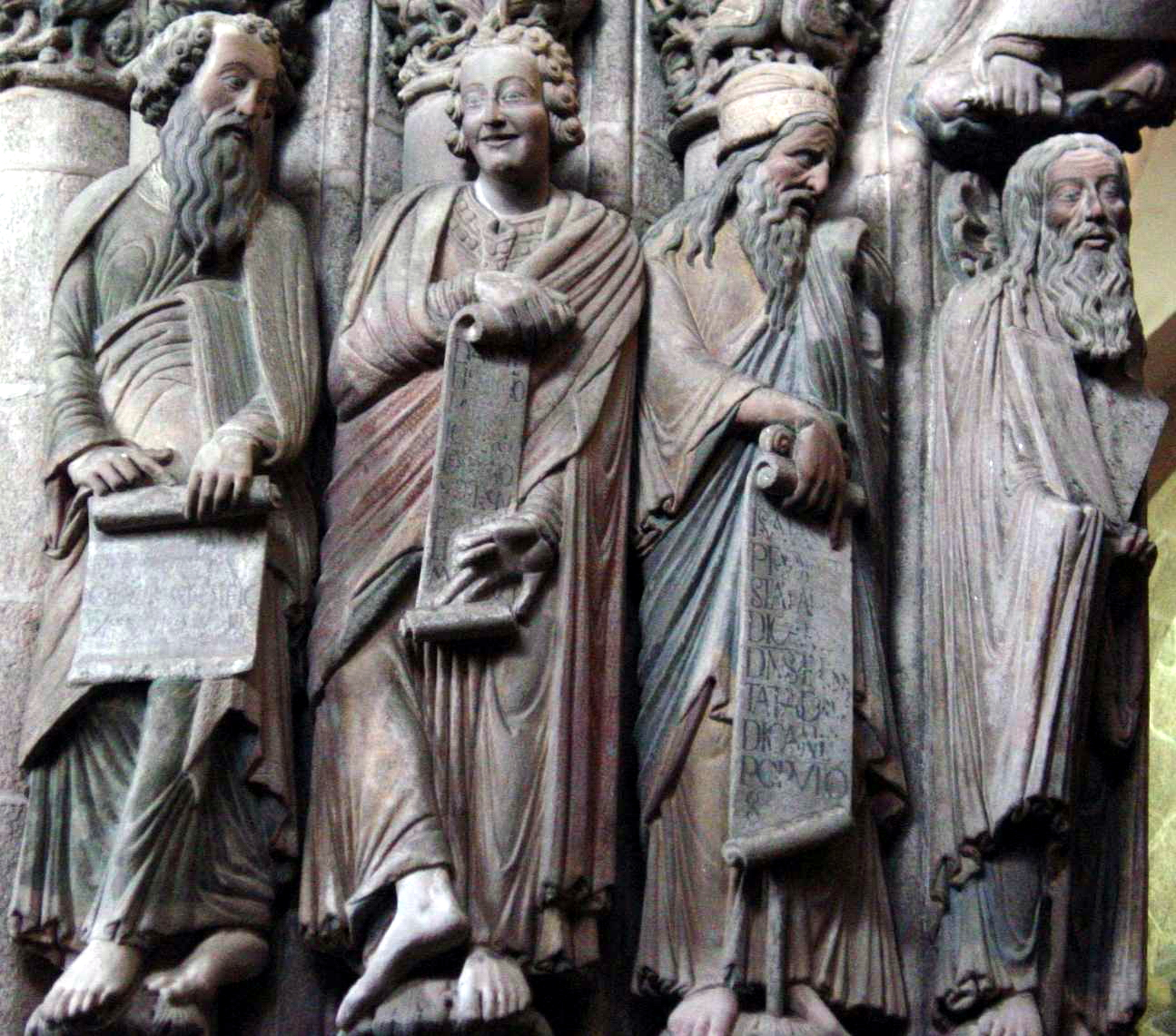
Pórtico da Gloria, Santiago Cathedral. The colouring once common to much Romanesque sculpture has been preserved.

==== Late Romanesque sculpture ====
Gothic architecture is usually considered to begin with the design of the choir at the Abbey of Saint-Denis, north of Paris, by the Abbot Suger, consecrated 1144. The beginning of Gothic sculpture is usually dated a little later, with the carving of the figures around the Royal Portal at Chartres Cathedral, France, 1150–1155. The style of sculpture spread rapidly from Chartres, overtaking the new Gothic architecture. In fact, many churches of the late Romanesque period post-date the building at Saint-Denis. The sculptural style based more upon observation and naturalism than on formalised design developed rapidly. It is thought that one reason for the rapid development of naturalistic form was a growing awareness of Classical remains in places where they were most numerous and a deliberate imitation of their style. The consequence is that there are doorways which are Romanesque in form, and yet show a naturalism associated with Early Gothic sculpture.

One of these is the Pórtico da Gloria dating from 1180, at Santiago de Compostela. This portal is internal and is particularly well preserved, even retaining colour on the figures and indicating the gaudy appearance of much architectural decoration which is now perceived as monochrome. Around the doorway are figures who are integrated with the colonnettes that make the mouldings of the doors. They are three-dimensional, but slightly flattened. They are highly individualised, not only in appearance but also expression and bear quite strong resemblance to those around the north porch of the Abbey of St. Denis, dating from 1170. Beneath the tympanum there is a realistically carved row of figures playing a range of different and easily identifiable musical instruments.

== Painting ==
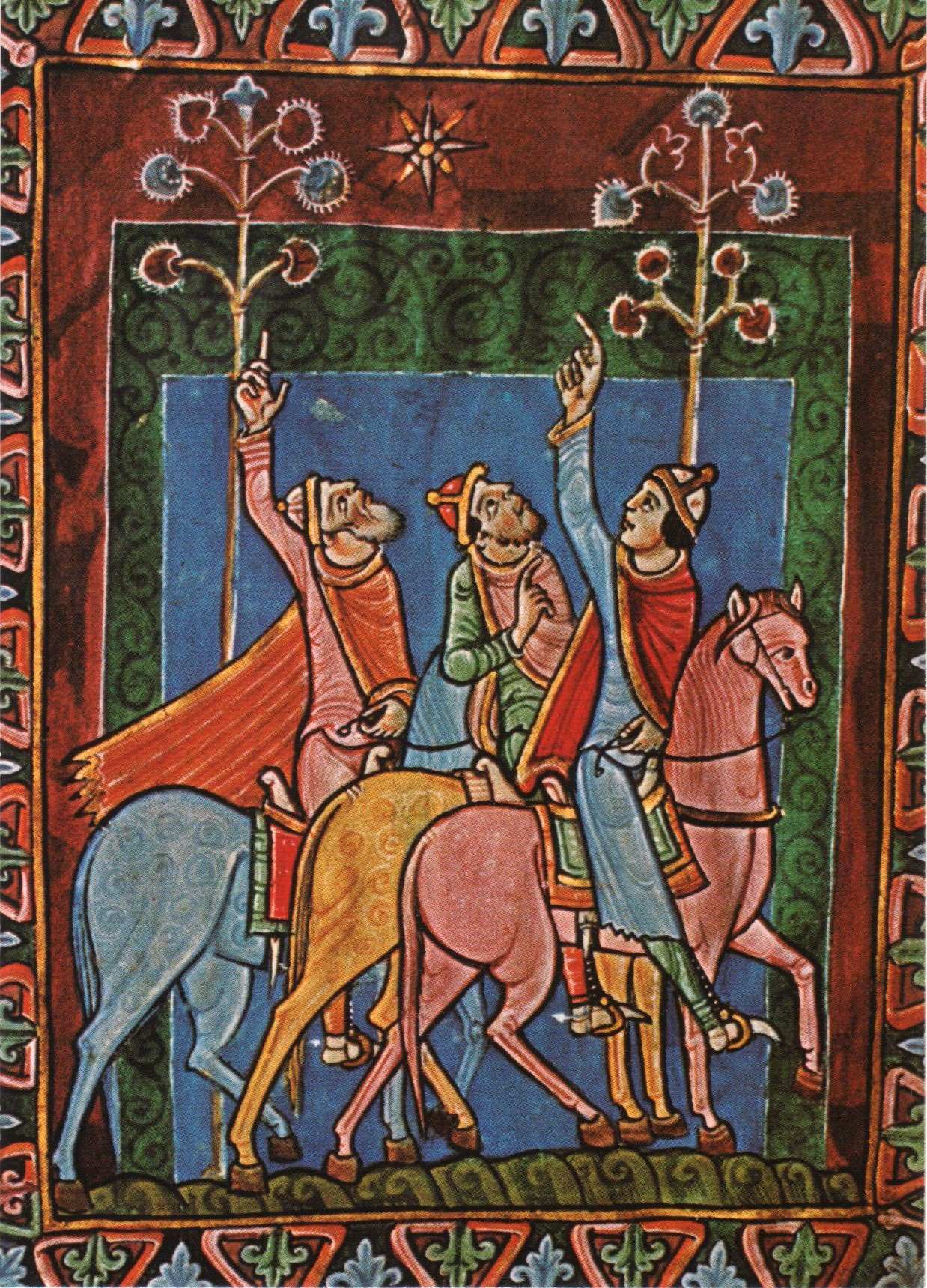
The Three Magi from the St. Albans Psalter, English, 12th century.

=== Manuscript illumination ===
A number of regional schools converged in the early Romanesque illuminated manuscript: the "Channel school" of England and Northern France was heavily influenced by late Anglo-Saxon art, whereas in Southern France the style depended more on Iberian influence, and in Germany and the Low Countries, Ottonian styles continued to develop, and also, along with Byzantine styles, influenced Italy. By the 12th century there had been reciprocal influences between all these, although naturally regional distinctiveness remained.

The typical foci of Romanesque illumination were the Bible, where each book could be prefaced by a large historiated initial, and the Psalter, where major initials were similarly illuminated. In both cases more lavish examples might have cycles of scenes in fully illuminated pages, sometimes with several scenes per page, in compartments. The Bibles in particular often had a, and might be bound into more than one volume. Examples include the St. Albans Psalter, Hunterian Psalter, Winchester Bible (the "Morgan Leaf" shown above), Fécamp Bible, Stavelot Bible, and Parc Abbey Bible. By the end of the period lay commercial workshops of artists and scribes were becoming significant, and illumination, and books generally, became more widely available to both laity and clergy.

=== Wall painting ===
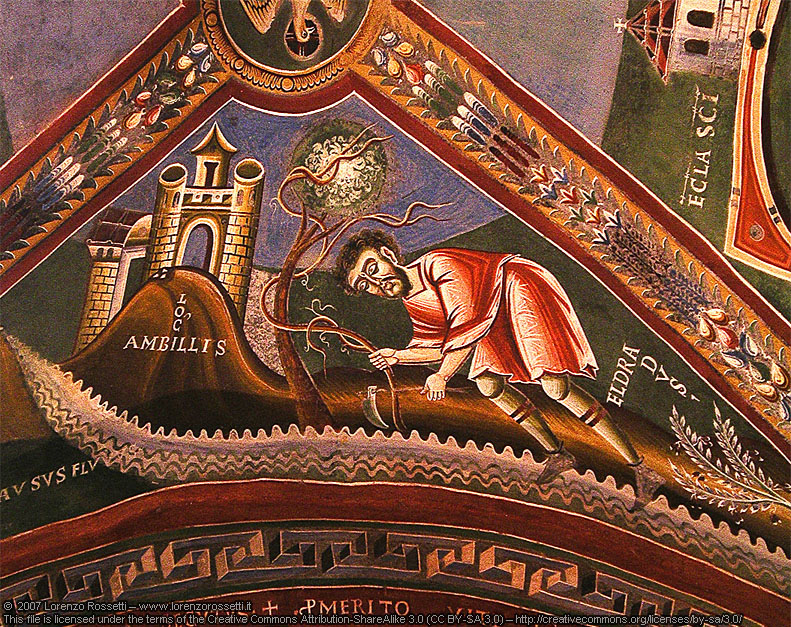
Life of St. Eldrado, abbot. 11th century fresco in Novalesa Abbey

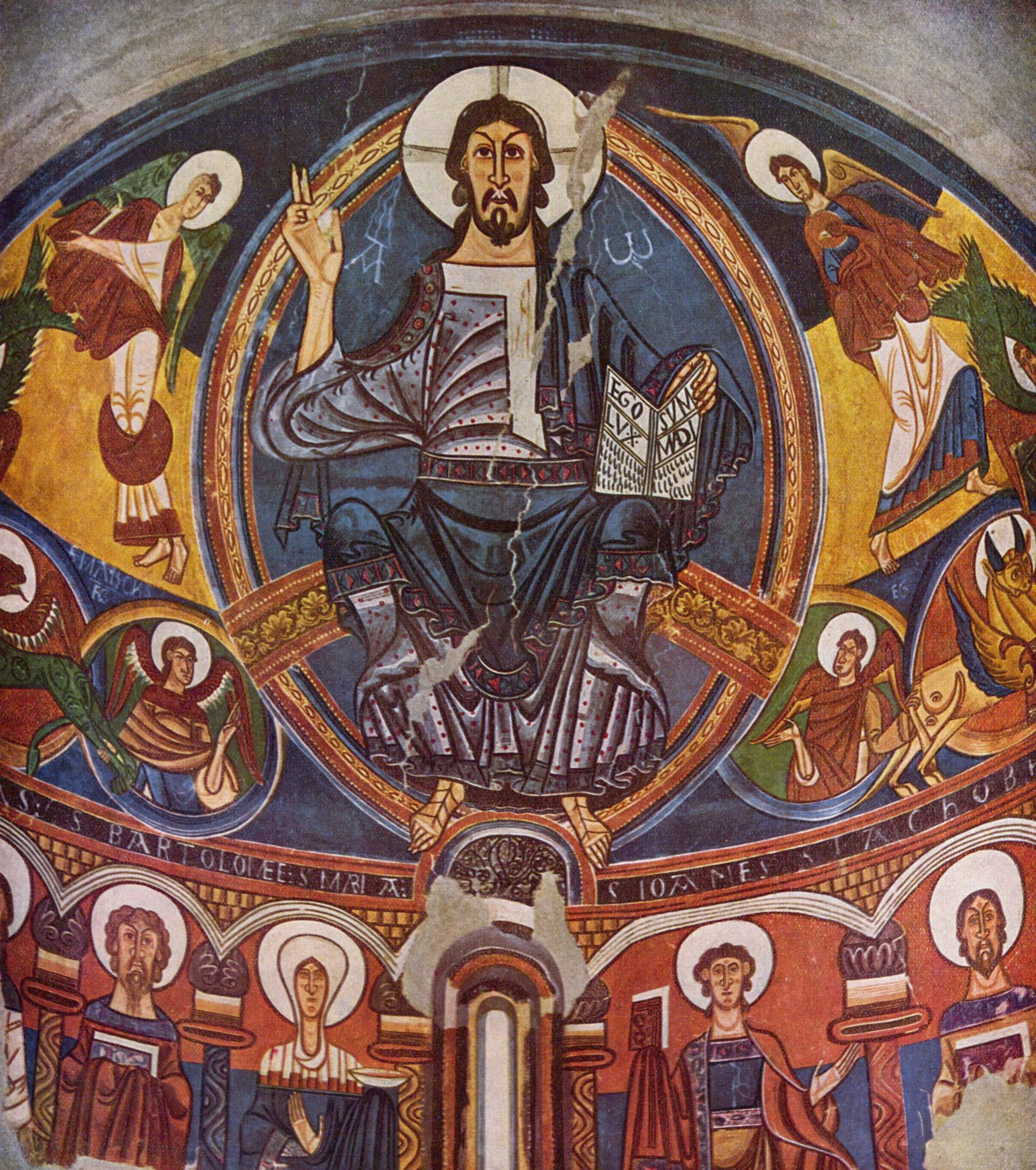
Apse of Sant Climent de Taüll, a fresco by the Master of Taüll, now in Museu Nacional d'Art de Catalunya.

The large wall surfaces and plain, curving vaults of the Romanesque period lent themselves to mural decoration. Unfortunately, many of these early wall paintings have been destroyed by damp or the walls have been replastered and painted over. In England, France and the Netherlands such pictures were systematically destroyed or whitewashed in bouts of Reformation iconoclasm. Murals in Denmark, as well as in Sweden, and elsewhere many have since been restored. In Catalonia (Spain), there was a campaign to save such murals in the early 20th century (as of 1907) by removing them and transferring them to safekeeping in Barcelona, resulting in the spectacular collection at the National Art Museum of Catalonia. In other countries they have suffered from war, neglect and changing fashion.

A classic scheme for the full painted decoration of a church, derived from earlier examples often in mosaic, had, as its focal point in the semi-dome of the apse, Christ in Majesty or Christ the Redeemer enthroned within a mandorla and framed by the four winged beasts, symbols of the Four Evangelists, comparing directly with examples from the gilt covers or the illuminations of Gospel Books of the period. If the Virgin Mary was the dedicatee of the church, she might replace Christ here. On the apse walls below would be saints and apostles, perhaps including narrative scenes, for example of the saint to whom the church was dedicated. On the sanctuary arch were figures of apostles, prophets or the twenty-four "Elders of the Apocalypse", looking in towards a bust of Christ, or his symbol the Lamb, at the top of the arch. The north wall of the nave would contain narrative scenes from the Old Testament, and the south wall from the New Testament. On the rear west wall would be a Last Judgement, with an enthroned and judging Christ at the top.

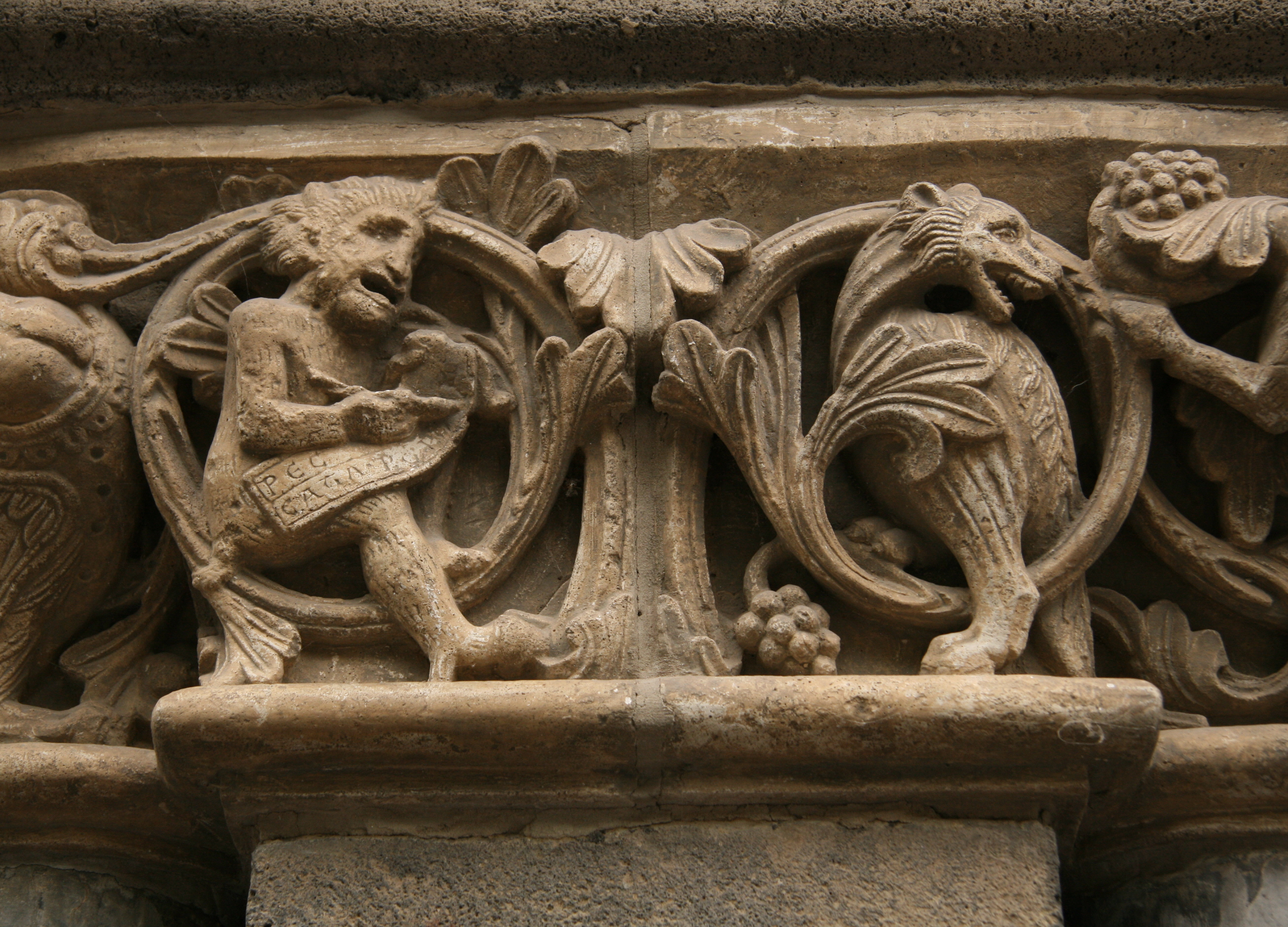
Carving from Maria Laach Abbey, in the Eifel, Rhineland.

One of the most intact schemes to exist is that at Saint-Savin-sur-Gartempe in France. The long barrel vault of the nave provides an excellent surface for fresco, and is decorated with scenes of the Old Testament, showing the Creation, the Fall of Man and other stories including a lively depiction of Noah's Ark complete with a fearsome figurehead and numerous windows through which can be seen Noah and his family on the upper deck, birds on the middle deck, while on the lower are the pairs of animals. Another scene shows with great vigour the swamping of Pharaoh's army by the Red Sea. The scheme extends to other parts of the church, with the martyrdom of the local saints shown in the crypt, and Apocalypse in the narthex and Christ in Majesty. The range of colours employed is limited to light blue-green, yellow ochre, reddish brown and black. Similar paintings exist in Serbia, Spain, Germany, Italy and elsewhere in France.

The now-dispersed paintings from Arlanza in the Province of Burgos, Spain, though from a monastery, are secular in subject-matter, showing huge and vigorous mythical beasts above a frieze in black and white with other creatures. They give a rare idea of what decorated Romanesque palaces would have contained.

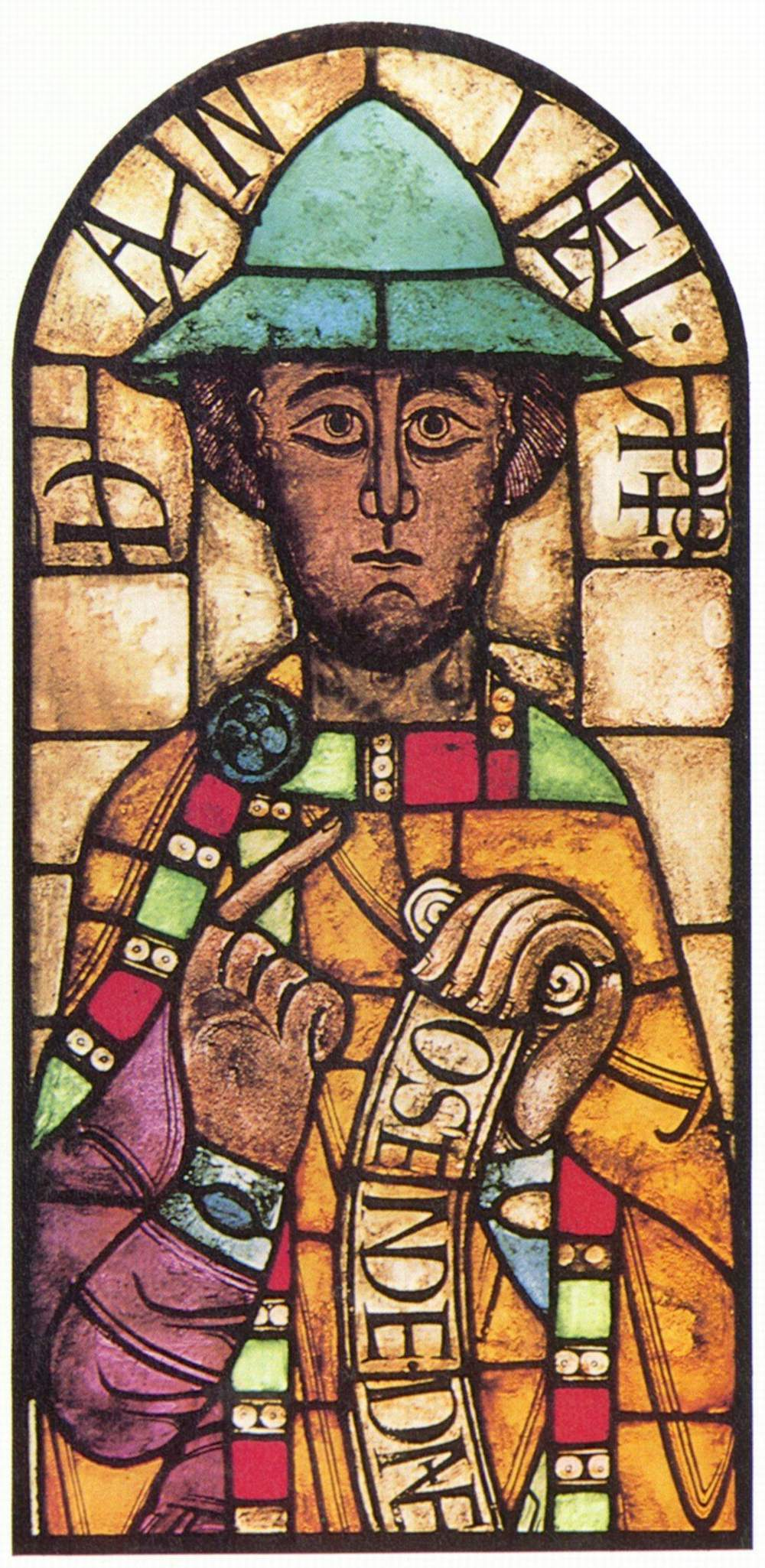
Stained glass, the Prophet Daniel from Augsburg Cathedral, late 11th century.

== Other visual arts ==
=== Fashion ===
In England and France, the Romanesque period saw the rise of pigaches, "scorpion-tail" or "ram's-horn" shoes much assailed by the clergy at the time. Orderic Vitalis in particular blamed them for the supposed rise in sodomy and homosexuality of the era. The shoes are now principally remembered as precursors to the much more extravagant poulaines that became popular following the Black Death.

=== Embroidery ===
Romanesque embroidery is best known from the Bayeux Tapestry in Bayeux, France or the Tapestry of Creation in Girona, Spain, but many more closely worked pieces of Opus Anglicanum ("English work" – considered the finest in the West) and other styles have survived, mostly as church vestments.

=== Stained glass ===
The oldest-known fragments of medieval pictorial stained glass appear to date from the 10th century. The earliest intact figures are five prophet windows at Augsburg, dating from the late 11th century. The figures, though stiff and formalised, demonstrate considerable proficiency in design, both pictorially and in the functional use of the glass, indicating that their maker was well accustomed to the medium. At Le Mans, Canterbury and Chartres Cathedrals, and Saint-Denis, a number of panels of the 12th century have survived. At Canterbury these include a figure of Adam digging, and another of his son Seth from a series of Ancestors of Christ. Adam represents a highly naturalistic and lively portrayal, while in the figure of Seth, the robes have been used to great decorative effect, similar to the best stone carving of the period. Glass craftsmen were slower than architects to change their style, and much glass from at least the first part of the 13th century can be considered as essentially Romanesque. Especially fine are large figures of 1200 from Strasbourg Cathedral (some now removed to the museum) and of about 1220 from Saint Kunibert's Church in Cologne.

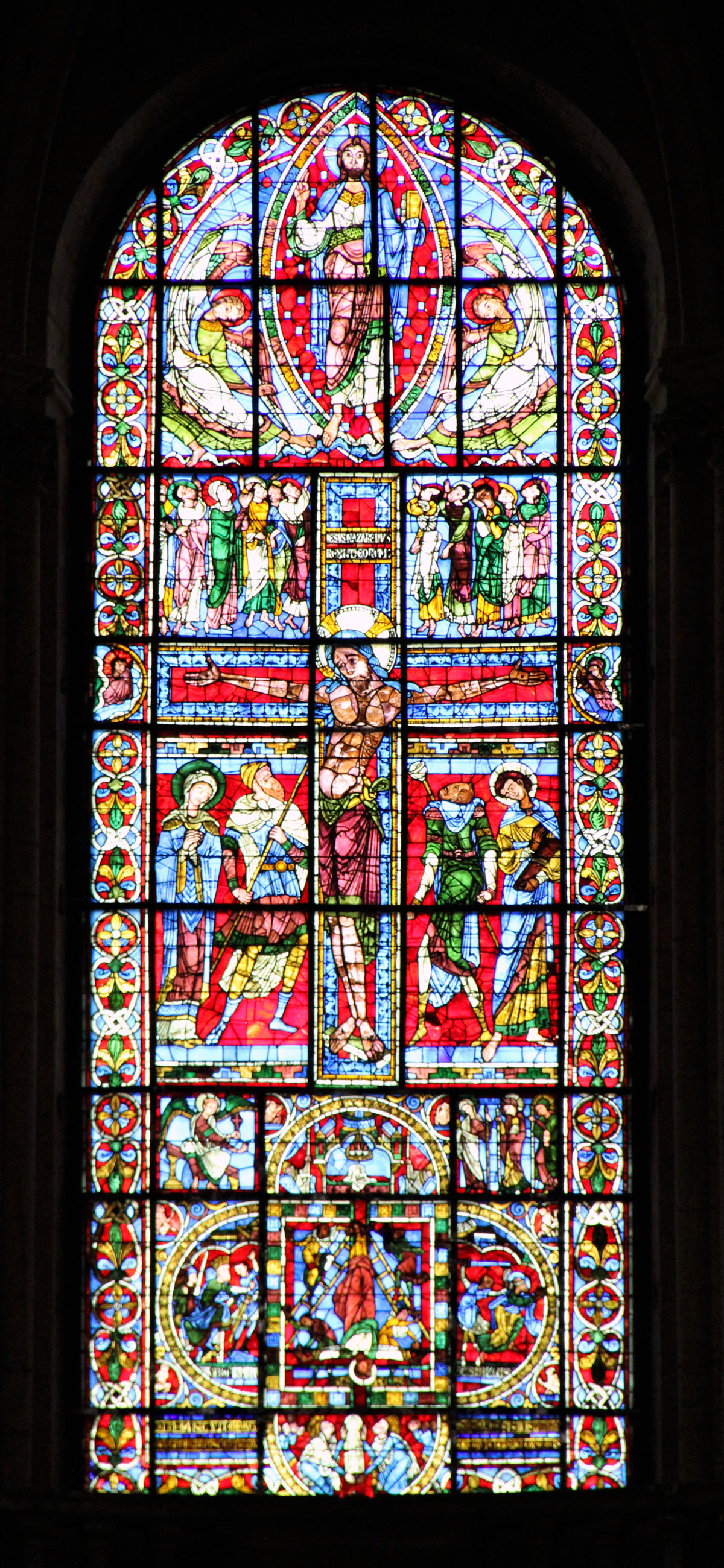
The Crucifixion of Poitiers Cathédrale Saint-Pierre

Most of the magnificent stained glass of France, including the famous windows of Chartres, date from the 13th century. Far fewer large windows remain intact from the 12th century. One such is the Crucifixion of Poitiers, a remarkable composition which rises through three stages, the lowest with a quatrefoil depicting the Martyrdom of St Peter, the largest central stage dominated by the crucifixion and the upper stage showing the Ascension of Christ in a mandorla. The figure of the crucified Christ is already showing the Gothic curve. The window is described by George Seddon as being of "unforgettable beauty". Many detached fragments are in museums, and a window at Twycross Church in England is made up of important French panels rescued from the French Revolution. Glass was both expensive and fairly flexible (in that it could be added to or re-arranged) and seems to have been often re-used when churches were rebuilt in the Gothic style – the earliest datable English glass, a panel in York Minster from a Tree of Jesse probably of before 1154, has been recycled in this way.

== See also ==
- List of Romanesque artists
- Spanish Romanesque
