= Master Hugo =

Earliest recorded professional artist in England

A scene from the Bury St Edmunds Bible (c. 1135) by Master Hugo

Master Hugo (fl. c.1130 – c.1150) was a Romanesque lay artist and the earliest recorded professional artist in England.

His documented career at Bury St Edmunds Abbey spans from before 1136 to after 1148. He is most famous for illuminating the first volume of the Bury Bible, which "have led to a general acknowledgement of Master Hugo as the gifted innovator of the main line of English Romanesque art". This was made for the Abbey in about 1135, and is now in the Parker Library of Corpus Christi College, Cambridge; it is not known whether he illuminated the second volume, of which only a small fragment is known to survive, now in a private collection in the United States. He is also recorded as making bronze doors for the western entry of the Abbey church, a great bell and a carved crucifix with figures of Mary and Saint John, for the Monk's Choir (probably a rood). He has been credited with having made the ivory Cloisters Cross (or "Bury St Edmunds Cross"), now at The Cloisters, New York.

It is not known where Master Hugo was born or trained. According to the Fitzwilliam Museum, "the magnificent colour patterns of his paintings, the startlingly new Byzantine draperies and the deep-staring eyes of Moses, Aaron and the Jews suggest that he had travelled at least to southern Italy and probably also to Cyprus, Byzantium, and even the Holy Land."
