= Winchester Bible =

12th-century illuminated manuscript

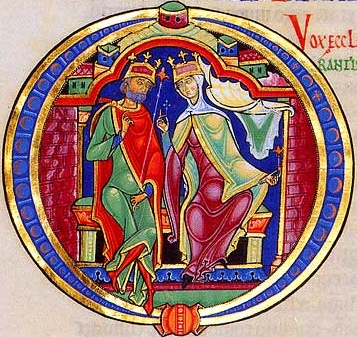
- Language: Latin
- Date: 1150s - 1170s
- Genre: Illuminated manuscripts

The Winchester Bible is a Romanesque illuminated manuscript produced in Winchester between 1150 and 1175. With folios measuring 583 x 396 mm., it is the largest surviving 12th-century English Bible. The Bible belongs to a group of large-sized Bibles that were made for religious houses all over England and the continent during the 12th century. The Bible is on permanent display in Winchester Cathedral's Kings & Scribes exhibition.

== History ==
=== Origin ===
During the Romanesque period, the focus of major illumination in Western Europe moved from the Gospel Book to the Psalter and the Bible. The Winchester manuscript is one of the most lavish Bibles of this kind. The manuscript was probably commissioned by the Bishop of Winchester, Henry of Blois.

== Description ==
The Bible contains 936 pages, as 468 leaves of calf-skin parchment, which equates to hides of about 250 calves. Originally consisting of two volumes, the Bible was rebound in 1820, when it was divided into three volumes, and then divided into four volumes when it was conserved by Beatrice Forder in 1948. The Bible was conserved again between 2014 and 2019 at the Bodleian Library, Oxford, and bound in four volumes.

=== Decoration ===
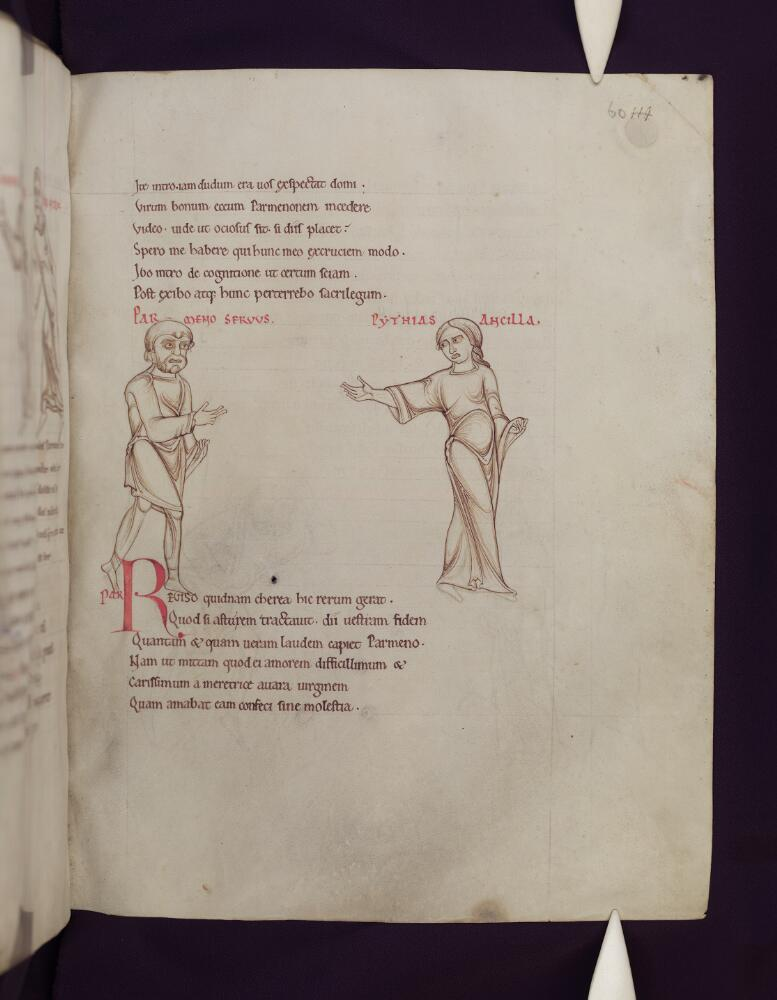
Incomplete page of the Winchester Bible.

The artwork of the Winchester Bible is incomplete. The illuminations throughout the manuscript appear in varying stages of completion, ranging from rough outlines and inked drawings to unpainted gilded images and figures complete in all but the final details. In all, 48 of the major historiated initials that begin each book stand complete. The different books of the Bible are determined by large decorative first initials; three books were important enough to have full-paged scenes dedicated to them. I Samuel, Judith, and Maccabees all have full page frontispieces but only I Samuel's was actually completed; the other two were left only as drawings.

The decoration of the manuscript is thought to have involved six different artists with particular styles, both figural and decorative. The presence of various styles makes it hard to determine the exact date of the Bible. The different styles could point towards two different periods in which the Bible was worked on, one earlier and one later. However, it could also imply that both traditional and ground-breaking artists of the time worked on the piece during the same period.

=== Text ===
Although many of the illuminations remain unfinished, the Latin text itself is complete. The Bible consists of the entire Vulgate, comprising both Old and New Testaments, two versions of the Psalms, and the Apocrypha, and is written in the Latin of St Jerome. Interestingly, the books of the Bible are all started on the same page as the last page of the previous book. The text also includes many abbreviations and shortened versions of words. This unusual system was thought to have been used to save space and money because the materials were so expensive.

== Creation ==
=== Transcribing ===
Due to the large size of the Bible, it had to be organized into many quires of four bi-folios. Each bi-folium would have been pricked for ruling to ensure the pages and lines of text were arranged properly. Ruling lines were lightly scored into the parchment, which the scribe would use as guides like the lines of a notebook. Unlike other manuscripts of this size, the Winchester Bible was written by the hand of one scribe with a goose feather quill. It is thought that the scribe would have been an accomplished member of the Winchester's Priory of St Swithun, and the work has been estimated to have taken at least four years to complete. After the text was written it was reviewed by a monk, and then colour was added to important words and letters.

=== Art ===
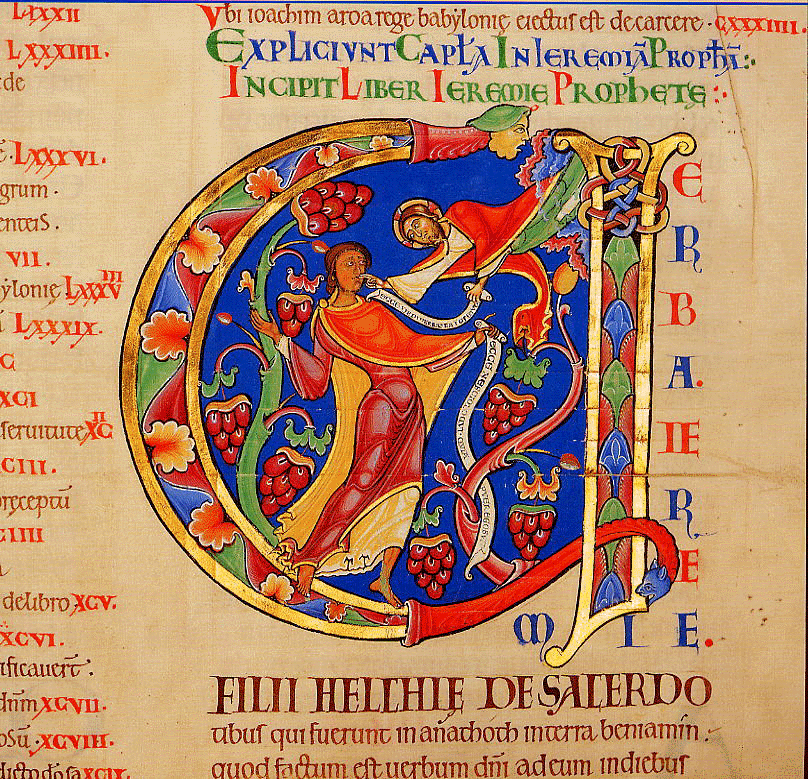
Fol.148. Detail of God addressing Jeremiah

The illuminations reflect the work of at least six different hands, and was worked on for 25 years between 1150 and 1175. The art historian Walter Oakeshott first identified and named these artists in 1945, referring to them as the Master of the Leaping Figures, the Master of the Apocrypha Drawings, the Master of the Genesis Initial, the Master of the Amalekite, the Master of the Morgan Leaf, and the Master of the Gothic Majesty. The Apocrypha Drawings Master was likely trained in France or Normandy since his style of energetic and mannered poses more closely resembles French art at the time, more so than English. The Master of Leaping Figures is almost positively English. The dramatic poses and leaping movements are hallmarks of the Byzantine style that was influential in Winchester, starting around 1130. The Master of the Morgan Leaf, the Amalekite Master, the Master of the Genesis Initial, and the Master of the Gothic Majesty all have varying styles derived from Byzantine influences and are precursors to the Early English Gothic Style.

Close examination of the illustrations revealed that several artists would have worked together on the same piece within the manuscript. First a dry point drawing would be traced by one artist, then another would apply gilding or silver accents, and then another artist would add coloured paint. Pigments were sourced from plants, animals, and minerals. The most expensive pigment to produce was not the silver or gold gilding, but the bright blue ultramarine which could only be sourced from lapis lazuli from Afghanistan. Forty-eight illuminated letters were completed, and many more were left unfinished.

== Contents ==
=== The Morgan Leaf ===
This page of the Winchester Bible is unique as it is one of three full-paged illuminations in the manuscript, and it is the only one that has been completed. This leaf shows scenes from the lives of Samuel on the recto and of King David on the verso. The Morgan Leaf was painted by the Master of the Morgan Leaf, and is why he was named as such. The Morgan Leaf is characterized by the bold emotion shown in the figures, with less attention paid to the details. The bold blues and reds also add to the emotional depth of the scene.

The leaf was most likely removed during the rebinding process in 1820, and was sold to John Pierpont Morgan in 1912 for 30,000 francs. The first person to recognise the connection between the Morgan Leaf and the Winchester Bible was the British Museum's Keeper of Manuscripts, Eric Millar, in 1926. The identification was later supported by other art historians, and supported by the evidence that the original drawing of the Morgan Leaf was also done by the same hand that did the underdrawings of the Winchester Bible, the Master of the Apocrypha Drawings. This was proven by comparison of the underdrawings of the Morgan Leaf to the incomplete illuminations of the Winchester Bible.

== Gallery ==
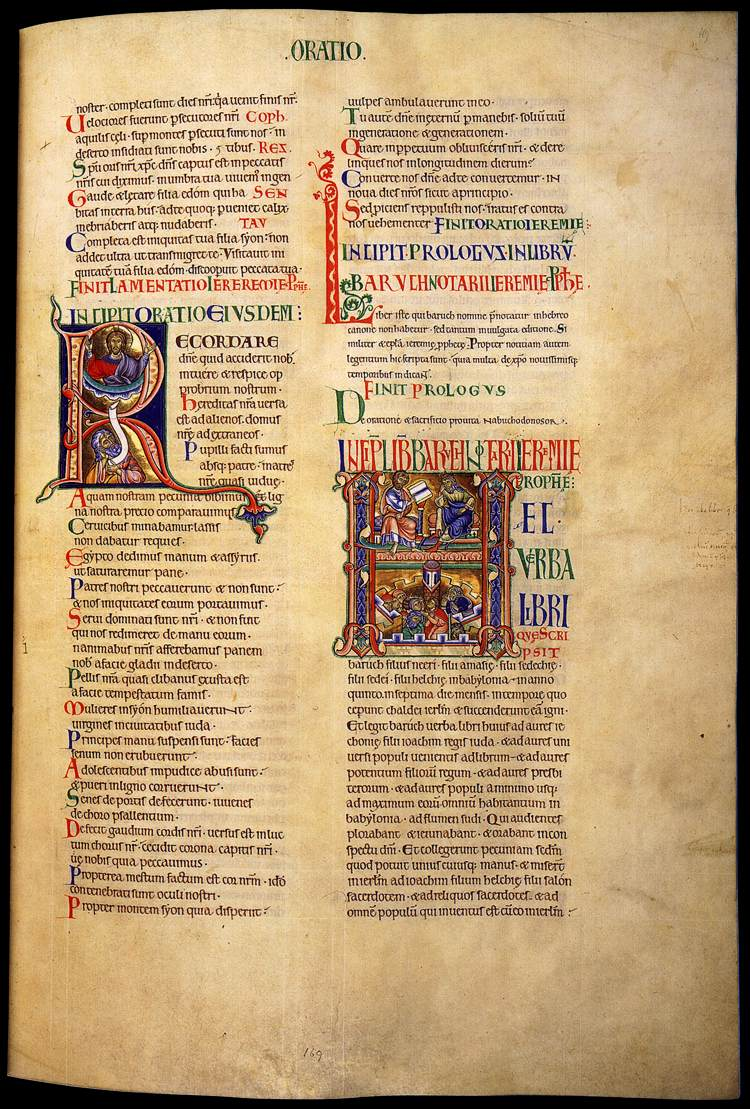
Fol.169. Lamentations 5. The prayer of Jeremiah

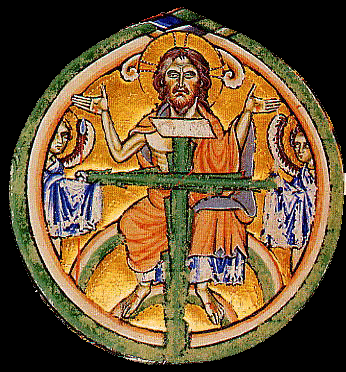
Fol.5, detail. Christ at the Last Judgment

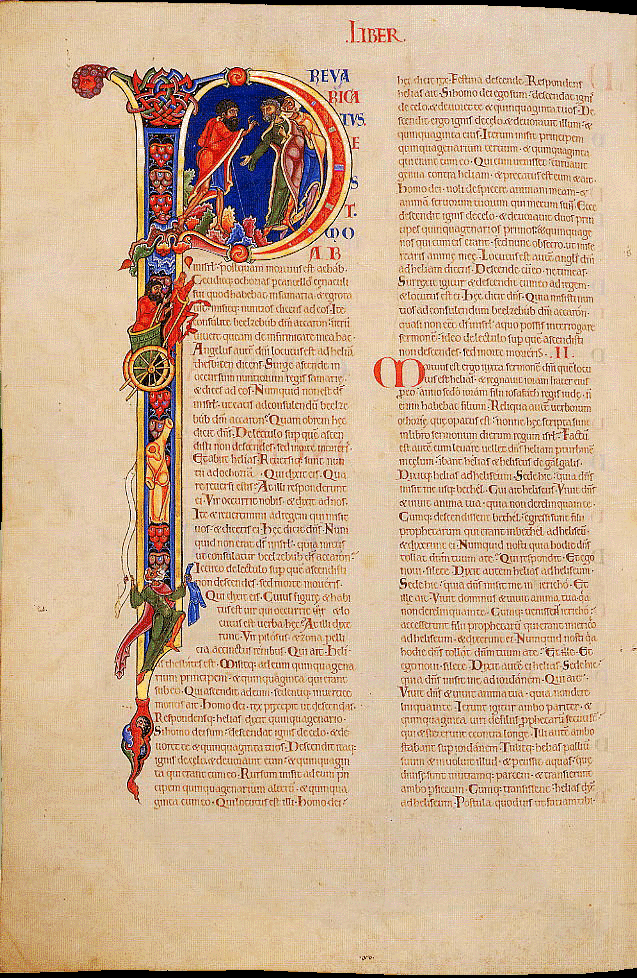
Fol.120v. Beginning of Second Kings with historiated initial showing the messengers of Elijah and Ahaziah

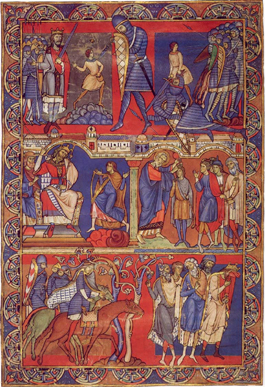
The Morgan Leaf. Scenes from the life of King David

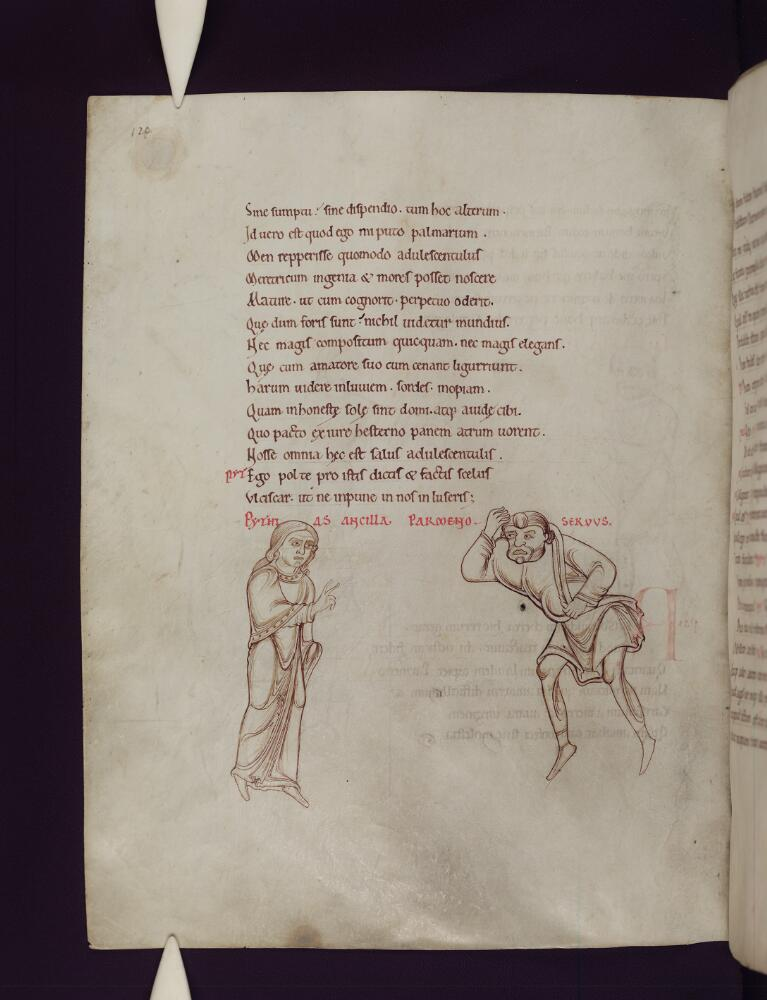
Comedies of Terence. Incomplete page of the Winchester Bible.

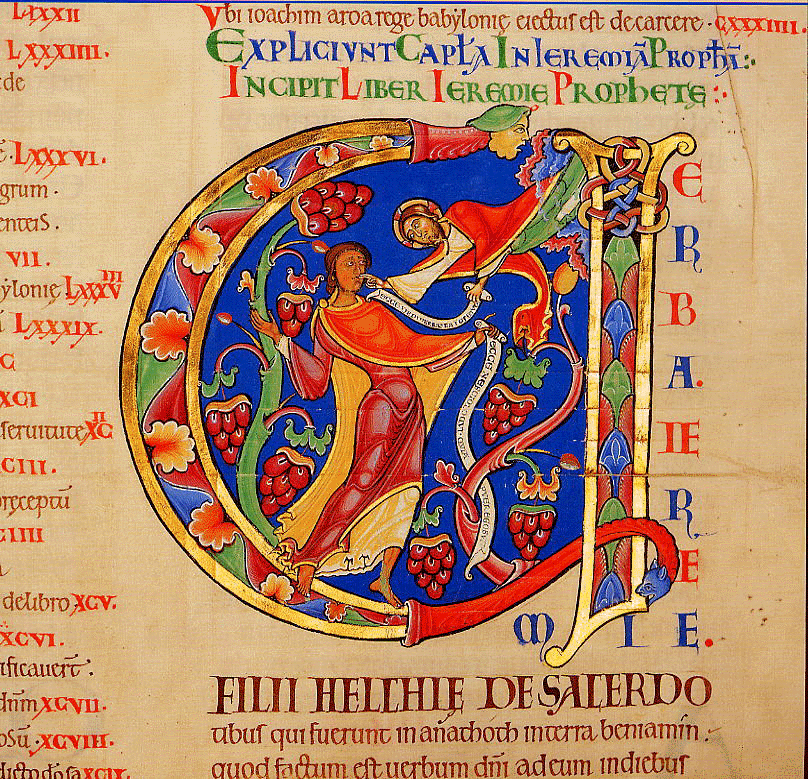
