= Virgin of Werpin =

Statue in Hotton, Belgium

Coordinates: 50.2588°N 5.4884°E

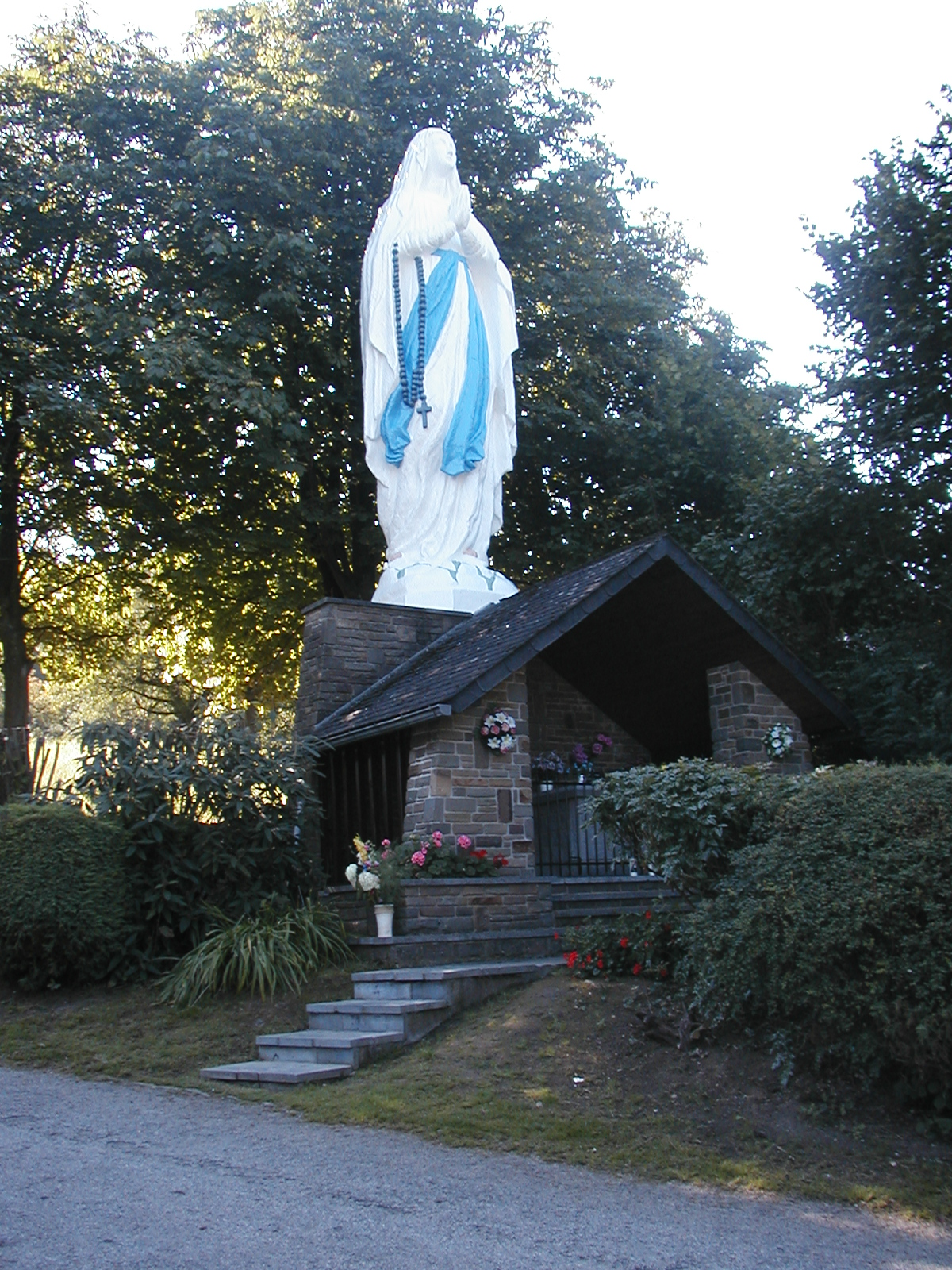
The Virgin of Werpin

The Virgin of Werpin (French: La Vierge de Werpin) is an 11.4 m (37 ft) tall statue of the Virgin Mary in Werpin, Hotton municipality in Belgium. The statue itself is 7 m (23 ft) tall and stands on a pedestal of 3.4 m (11 ft). In front of the statue stands a small prayer house. The statue was founded after an epidemic hit the village. The funds were raised by the local father Janus, who led the operation. The statue was designed by Louis Hoyoux and Auguste Fabert, and it was inaugurated on 2 September 1931 by the Bishop of Namur, Monsignor Thomas Louis Heylen, and father Janus in the presence of 10,000 pilgrims.

It is said that the statue has always protected the village and its inhabitants. During the Battle of the Bulge in the Second World War, the Germans were in the nearby forest and were shooting at the village of Hampteau, 1.5 km (1 mi) from Werpin, where the Americans were based. Everyone survived the attack because they hid behind the Virgin of Werpin.

The statue is on the route of the local Côte de la Vierge de Werpin, popular as a cycling col. This 2.4 km (1 mi) long climb runs from the river Ourthe to the top of the hill, gaining 155 m (170 yd) of elevation at a maximum gradient of 6.7%.
