= List of protected heritage sites in Hotton =

This table shows an overview of the protected heritage sites in the Walloon town Hotton. This list is part of Belgium's national heritage.

Object	Year/architect	Town/section	Address	Coordinates	Number^{?}	Image
Faber Mill ^{(nl)} ^{(fr)}		Hotton	rue Haute	50.267669°N 5.451673°E	83028-CLT-0001-01 Info	Oude watermolen
Ensemble formed by the cliffs overlooking the Ourthe at the place called "Plage de Renissart" on which the remains of an old refuge camp called "Ti-Château" are ^{(nl)} ^{(fr)}		Hotton		50.267090°N 5.455219°E	83028-CLT-0002-01 Info	
Caves of Hotton and Hampteau ^{(nl)} ^{(fr)}		Hotton		50.257005°N 5.448433°E	83028-CLT-0003-01 Info	Grotten van Hotton en Hampteau
Totality of Deulin Castle, the chapel, with walls and roofs of the outbuildings, and the ensemble of the surrounding land ^{(nl)} ^{(fr)}		Hotton	rue du Château n°4	50.302927°N 5.400916°E	83028-CLT-0004-01 Info	Totaliteit van kasteel van Deulin, de kapel, met de gevels en daken van de bijgebouwen, en ensemble van dit met het omliggende terrein
Old furnace, now pavillon of castle ^{(nl)} ^{(fr)}		Hotton		50.247641°N 5.398239°E	83028-CLT-0006-01 Info	
Farm: facades and roofs of all buildings on plot 436 E 428 D and bakery plot ^{(nl)} ^{(fr)}		Hotton	rue du Noyer, n°5	50.278959°N 5.438912°E	83028-CLT-0007-01 Info	
Church of Saint-Pierre and churchyard wall ^{(nl)} ^{(fr)}		Hotton		50.279457°N 5.438240°E	83028-CLT-0009-01 Info	Kerk Saint-Pierre en kerkhofmuur
Facades and roofs of the house, including the interior ^{(nl)} ^{(fr)}		Hotton	rue Haute n°4	50.268396°N 5.448123°E	83028-CLT-0010-01 Info	
Castle farm of Ny ^{(nl)} ^{(fr)}		Hotton		50.284076°N 5.478277°E	83028-CLT-0011-01 Info	Kasteelhoeve van Ny
Facades and roofs of Deulin castle, except the back, including three salons ^{(nl)} ^{(fr)}		Hotton	rez-de-chaussée	50.302927°N 5.400916°E	83028-PEX-0001-01 Info	
The colorful interior of the church Saint-Pierre ^{(nl)} ^{(fr)}		Hotton	Melreux	50.279457°N 5.438240°E	83028-PEX-0002-01 Info	

== See also ==
- List of protected heritage sites in Luxembourg (Belgium)
- Hotton
