= Ti-Château =

Coordinates: 50.2672°N 5.458°E

Ti-Château is an old Roman oppidum (currently only ruins and a rebuilt watch tower) located near the Belgian village of Hotton. It defended an ancient city/village at the current location of Hotton. The old oppidum and its ruins lie at a triangular plateau called the Plage de Renissart, near large rock cliffs above the river Ourthe. It is likely that Ti-château was already habituated during the Neolithic, though most excavations are Roman.

Ti-Château is also famous among tourists for its views over the Ourthe valley and the villages of Hotton and Hampteau.
