= Château de Beurthé =

Castle in Belgium

Coordinates: 50.1451°N 5.9028°E

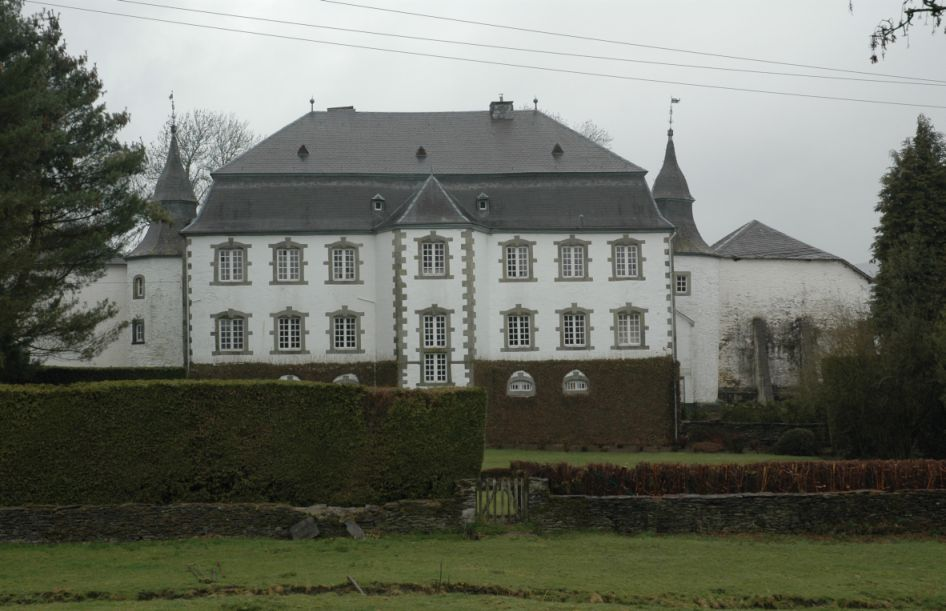
Rear façade of the castle

Château de Beurthé or Château de Steinbach is a castle situated in Steinbach, municipality of Gouvy, southeastern Belgium. Its park borders on the small river Steinbach, a tributary of the Ourthe Orientale.

== Etymology ==
The name of the castle and its owners has changed throughout history. The name "Steinbach" has been spelled Steinbac (1276), Stambaz (1363), Stembasche (1372), Stembaix (1372), Stembay (1395-1580), and Stembaye (1611-1716).

== History ==
The foundations and the basement of the castle date back to the 11th century and are built with schist stone. The stone-carved escutcheon built into the façade of the castle contains three scallops referring to Steinbach and Limerlé, and three sickles referring to Grumelscheid.

The Steinbach family and dynasty became lords of Rouvroy and Limerlé in 1451 and will keep this title and rule the region until the late 18th century. Alliances were built through marriage and over the years the titles of the lord of Steinbach, Limerlé, Grumelscheid, Aspelt, Bourcy and Longvilly were added to this noble house. As an example a document dated 1578 refers to the marriage of Georges Ramel de Steinbach and Margueritte de Grumelscheid.

During the Spanish reign over what is now known as Belgium and Holland Martin I de Steinbach bought back his castle and his right to rule the region from King Philip IV of Spain. He equally acquired the right to speak justice and the death penalty. On the 1777 Ferraris maps, a gallows can be found close to the castle. The links with the Spanish rulers, however, was still very strong and as such, some revenues of the land would be to the benefit of Isabella of Spain in infinity. The three lions can be found back on the escutcheons of Catherine van der Heyden wife of Martin de Steinbach. The escutcheon of Martin de Steinbach are as mention the three saint James scallops referring to Santiago de Compostela.

In 1802 shortly after the French revolution, Henri de Steinbach buys a Malmedy-based paper mill which the monks of Malmedy had started in 1750. This mill was the base for what was soon to be known as a brand of famous photographic film. The wealth coming from this paper mill allowed the family to maintain their castle. In Malmedy the Villa Lang and Villa Steissel, both national monuments were built by the Steinbach family. The family owned the Castle of Liherin and the castle du Mesnil both located in Steinbach as well as 4.000 hectares of farmland and woods.

During the Second World War the castle played a significant role in the Battle of the Bulge. It was beside a temporary headquarter for Léon Degrelle and his government a field hospital for both the German and US army.

The castle stayed in the hands of descendants of the Steinbach family until 2014 when it was sold to its current owners who used it as a second residence.

== Architecture ==
The castle has a very Austrian style architecture which can be explained by the fact that the castle was erected after a devastating fire in 1750 which burnt most of the existing castle to ruins. The architect was Albert Starck from Austria who during the Austrian reign of this part of Europe built several important buildings (today national monuments) in this area such as the rectory of Bovingy. The castle itself is built in 1.5-meter thick schist stone walls. The wings were added in the early 19th century and served as farmhouses. The farm was reachable from the outside leaving all privacy to the castle. The interior floors are built in schist stone and the style is Louis XV. The main entrance to the castle is carved out of Recht stone and contains the escutcheon of the Beurthé. The farms also contain a wood oven dating back to the 16th century. The oven is still in regular use today. On the top of the tower, one can see elephant shaped flags bearing the family escutcheons and building date. All buildings on this site are protected as national monuments.
