= List of protected heritage sites in Esneux =

This table shows an overview of the protected heritage sites in the Walloon town Esneux. This list is part of Belgium's national heritage.

Object	Year/architect	Town/section	Address	Coordinates	Number^{?}	Image
Watchtower of farmhouse of Evieux ^{(nl)} ^{(fr)}		Esneux		50.524516°N 5.571157°E	62032-CLT-0001-01 Info	Wachttoren van de boerderij van Evieux
2 linden trees in Avionpuits woods ^{(nl)} ^{(fr)}		Esneux		50.537944°N 5.589426°E	62032-CLT-0002-01 Info	
Plateau van Beaumont ^{(nl)} ^{(fr)}		Esneux		50.537499°N 5.568503°E	62032-CLT-0004-01 Info	
Slopes of the Plateau van Beaumont ^{(nl)} ^{(fr)}		Esneux		50.537289°N 5.559077°E	62032-CLT-0005-01 Info	
Mary's park ^{(nl)} ^{(fr)}		Esneux		50.524048°N 5.544594°E	62032-CLT-0007-01 Info	
Castle La Vaux and park ^{(nl)} ^{(fr)}		Esneux		50.533201°N 5.565961°E	62032-CLT-0008-01 Info	
Ourthe ^{(nl)} ^{(fr)}		Esneux		50.559184°N 5.553817°E	62032-CLT-0010-01 Info	Ourthe
Boubou woods ^{(nl)} ^{(fr)}		Esneux		50.550246°N 5.593730°E	62032-CLT-0011-01 Info	
Boubou woods ^{(nl)} ^{(fr)}		Esneux		50.548117°N 5.593056°E	62032-CLT-0012-01 Info	
Castle Brunsode and park ^{(nl)} ^{(fr)}		Esneux	Tilff	50.568655°N 5.586170°E	62032-CLT-0014-01 Info	Kasteel (gevels en daken) en het park (deel, vier tulpbomen en een beuk)
Valley of Chawresse ^{(nl)} ^{(fr)}		Esneux		50.550256°N 5.603724°E	62032-CLT-0017-01 Info	
Valley of Chawresse (extension) and woods around memorial A. Donnay ^{(nl)} ^{(fr)}		Esneux		50.551661°N 5.591677°E	62032-CLT-0018-01 Info	
Riverbed Ourthe from Hony bridge to Neuray bridge ^{(nl)} ^{(fr)}		Esneux		50.550932°N 5.554470°E	62032-CLT-0020-01 Info	Het bed van de Ourthe en haar oevers, tot het hoogste punt en de paden en routes erlangs en bieden toegang vanaf de brug Neuray van Esneux tot aan de brug van Hony, de uitbreiding van de rue du Centre
"La Roche Trouée" rocks ^{(nl)} ^{(fr)}		Esneux		50.532648°N 5.567867°E	62032-CLT-0021-01 Info	
Castle Le Fy ^{(nl)} ^{(fr)}		Esneux		50.533079°N 5.570890°E	62032-CLT-0022-01 Info	Monument: gevels en daken, begane grond en de de trap van het kasteel "Le Fy", ter plaatse geheten "Bois Madame"
Presbytery St. Hubert ^{(nl)} ^{(fr)}		Esneux	rue du Mont n° 13	50.534287°N 5.569516°E	62032-CLT-0023-01 Info	
Farmhouse ^{(nl)} ^{(fr)}		Esneux	quai des Pêcheurs n° 2	50.547515°N 5.590401°E	62032-CLT-0024-01 Info	
Montfort quarry ^{(nl)} ^{(fr)}		Esneux		50.510216°N 5.568350°E	62032-CLT-0026-01 Info	
Old house ^{(nl)} ^{(fr)}		Esneux	rue du Centre 43, Hony	50.540716°N 5.579360°E	62032-CLT-0027-01 Info	
Ham village ^{(nl)} ^{(fr)}		Esneux		50.542492°N 5.558714°E	62032-CLT-0028-01 Info	Gehucht Ham
Castle Avionpuits ^{(nl)} ^{(fr)}		Esneux		50.535125°N 5.595179°E	62032-CLT-0029-01 Info	Kasteel van Avionpuits: kasteel, deel van de boerderij en diens bijgebouwen, twee hoektorens naar het park, muur om het park (uitgezonderd gloriette), keermuur van de vijver, ijzerwerk, kasteel, boerderij, bijgebouwen, park, dreef met esdoornen en omgeving
Plateau van Beaumont ^{(nl)} ^{(fr)}		Esneux		50.537499°N 5.568503°E	62032-PEX-0001-01 Info	
Slopes of plateau van Beaumont ^{(nl)} ^{(fr)}		Esneux		50.537289°N 5.559077°E	62032-PEX-0002-01 Info	
Ourthe riverbed from Hony to Neuray ^{(nl)} ^{(fr)}		Esneux		50.550932°N 5.554470°E	62032-PEX-0003-01 Info	Het bed van de Ourthe en haar oevers, tot het hoogste punt en de paden en routes erlangs en bieden toegang vanaf de brug Neuray van Esneux tot aan de brug van Hony
Ham village ^{(nl)} ^{(fr)}		Esneux		50.541930°N 5.559848°E	62032-PEX-0004-01 Info	Het gehucht Ham

== See also ==
- List of protected heritage sites in Liège (province)
