= Deulin =

Deulin is a surname. Notable people with the surname include:

- Charles Deulin (1827–1877), French writer, theatre critic, and folklorist
- Charles-Joseph de Harlez de Deulin (1832–1899), Belgian Orientalist, domestic prelate, canon of the cathedral of Liège
- Vladislav Deulin (* 1994), Russian sport climber

== See also ==
- Deulin Castle, a château in the village of Deulin in the province of Luxembourg, Wallonia, Belgium
