= Riveo Centre =

Coordinates: 50°16′06″N 5°26′53″E

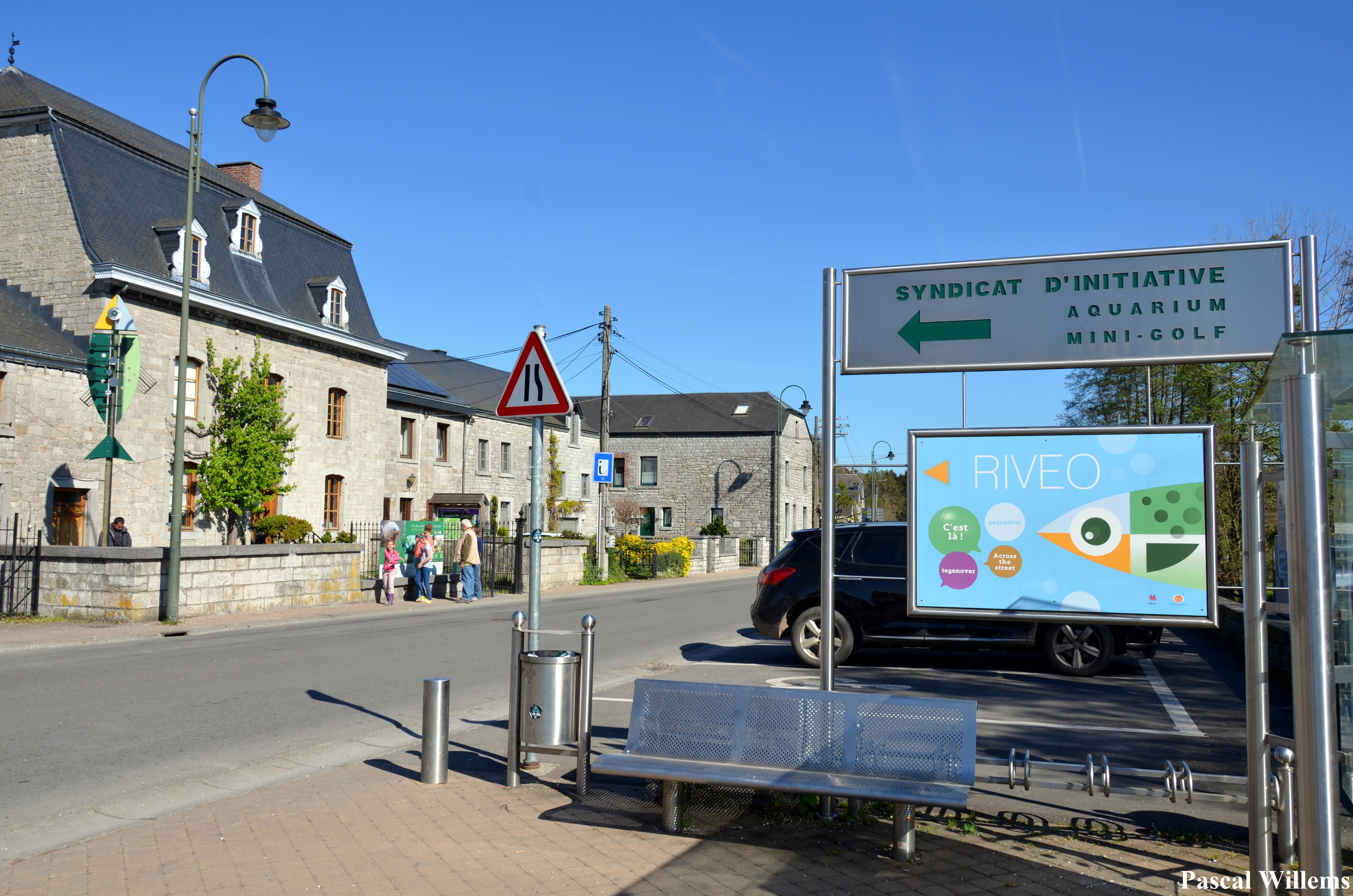
Street view of Riveo

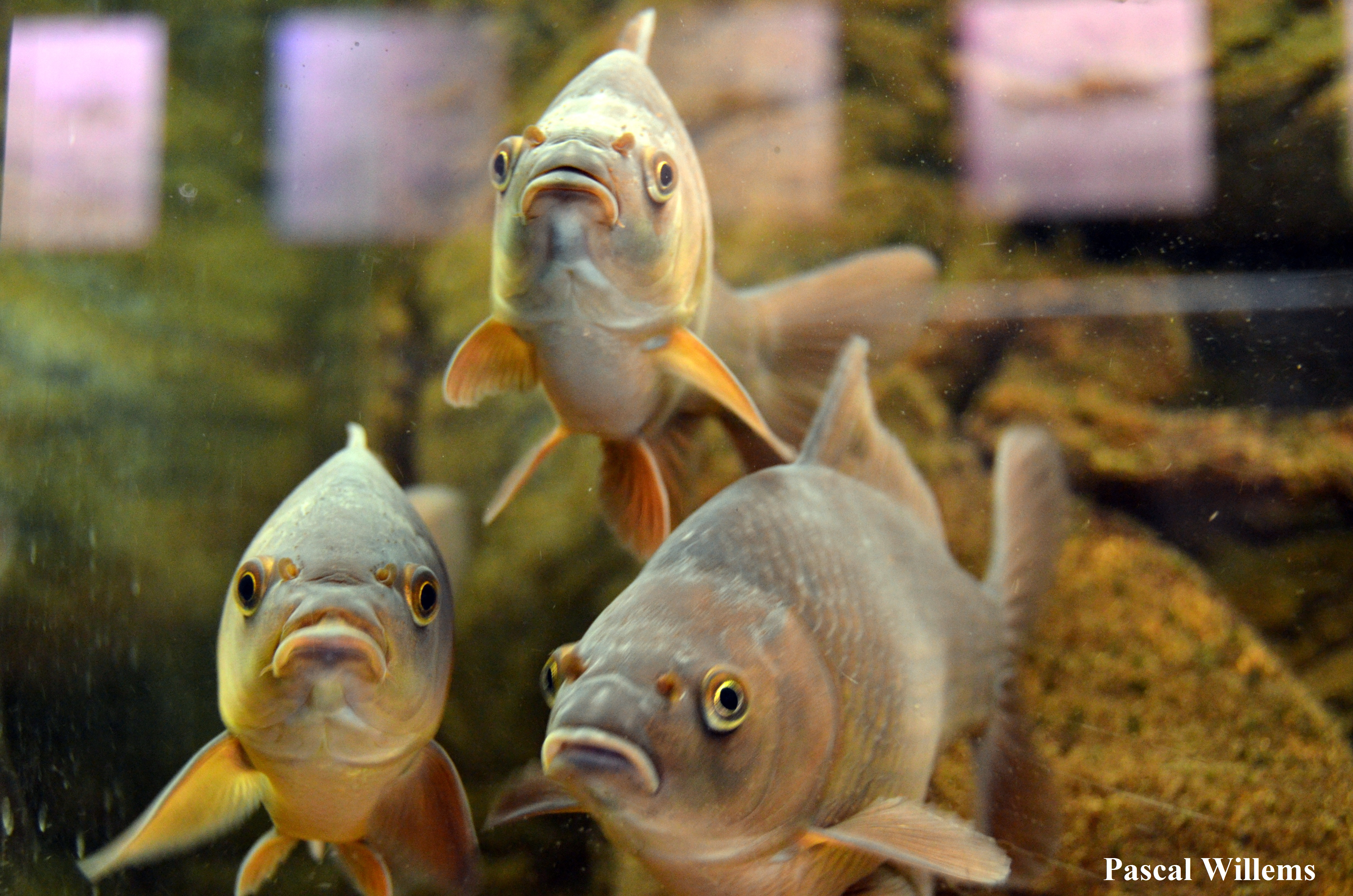
River fish in one of the aquariums

Riveo is an environmental interpretive centre of the river Ourthe situated in Hotton, Belgium, since April 2007.

== History ==
In 1996, two nature enthusiasts wanted to establish a structure to sensitize the population of Hotton to the wealth of the Ourthe. The project quickly became bigger with the idea of creating a "Showcase of Fauna and Flora" in the garden of the Maison Godenir, thanks to the support of the City and the Region. From 2004, with European funding, several regional actors set up an "Interpretive Centre of the River" cell within the tourist information office of Hotton. In March 2007, because of its success, the non-profit-making organization Interpretive Centre of the River became independent and opened its doors on a wildlife and river discovery site that would quickly expand its environmental awareness activities. In 2008, the Interpretive Centre of the River continued to develop with an ongoing project for fishing tourism supported by various regional and European partners. The aim was to set up fishing areas, to create appropriate signage, to train guides recognized by the Tourism Commission and to set up activities (initiation, improvement) for various fishing techniques, equipment provided etc. In 2010, the Interpretive Centre of the River got a facelift and became RIVEO (les rives et l’eau: "the banks and the water").

== Description ==
Riveo offers several environmental awareness activities.

- A complex of 16 aquariums and a reconstructed river arm allowing visitors to discover the different species of the region.
- Thematic exhibitions in didactic form allowing visitors to discover the river and its fauna (crayfish, beavers ...).
- Nature and fishing activities with guides to discover the fauna and the richness of the river.
- Activities related to fishing (crayfish, trout).
- An eighteen-hole mini-golf course to practice in the 5 thematic gardens (monastic, Moorish, labyrinth, renaissance and contemporary).

== Awards ==
European competition EDEN And Leader+
