= St. Peter's Church, Melreux =

Roman Catholic church in Hotton, Belgium

Coordinates: 50.2794°N 5.4383°E

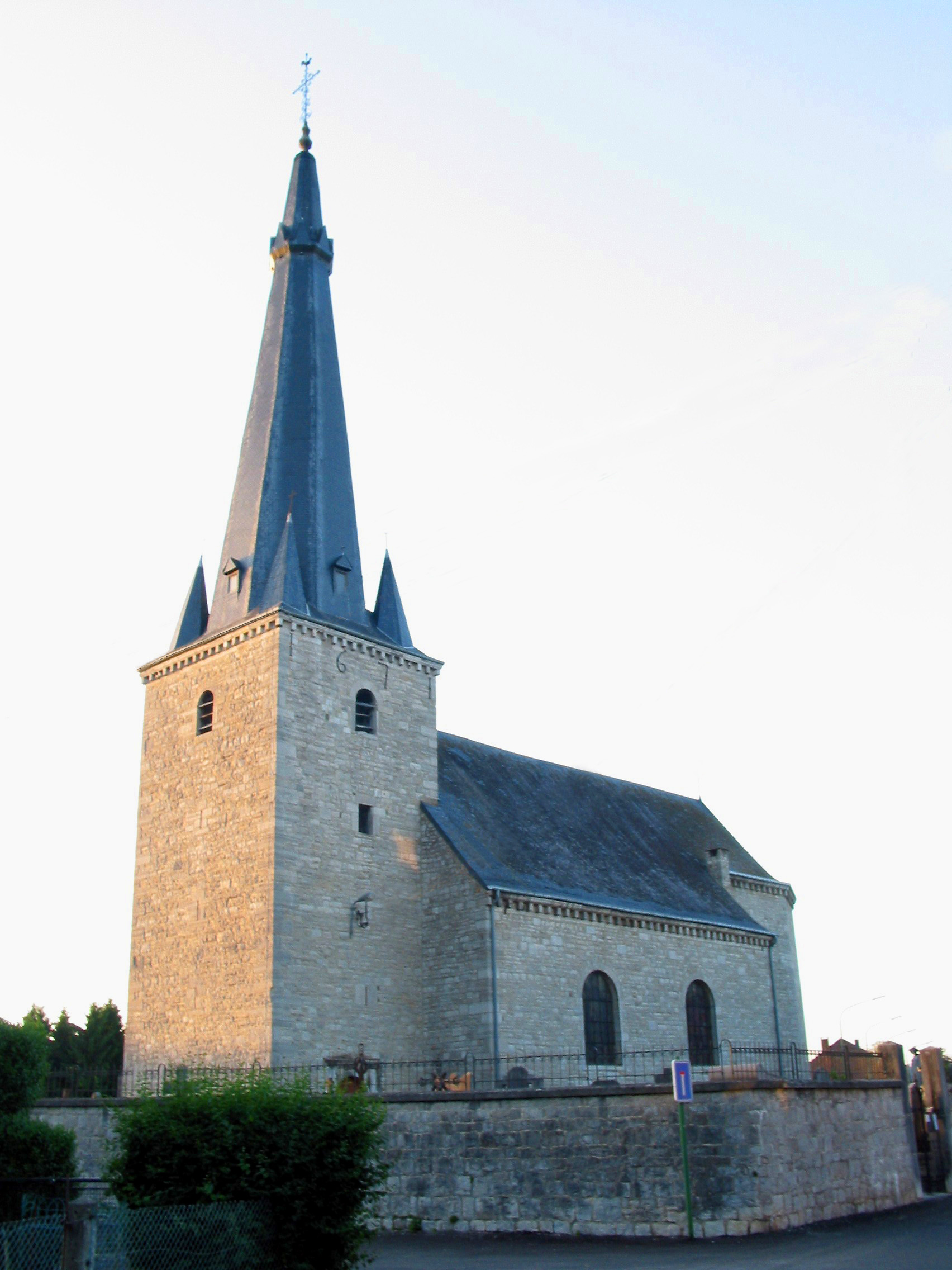
St. Peter's Church in Melreux

St. Peter's Church, Melreux (French: Église Saint-Pierre de Melreux) is a Roman Catholic church on the Avenue de la Gare in Melreux in the municipality of Hotton, Belgium.

The present church, whose tower is flanked by four turrets, dates from 1671, although the 12th-century Romanesque baptismal font and medieval tombstones attest to the existence of an earlier building. The interior furnishings include some beautiful paintings, including one of Mount Golgotha attributed to the artist Riga, and an altar in the Louis XIII style.

The church was completely destroyed during the Battle of the Bulge (winter of 1944–45) by the mortars of the German forces, who were fighting the oncoming Americans. Most of the interior was saved. The church was rebuilt after the war and since 1989 has had the status of a protected monument.
