= Lake Nisramont =

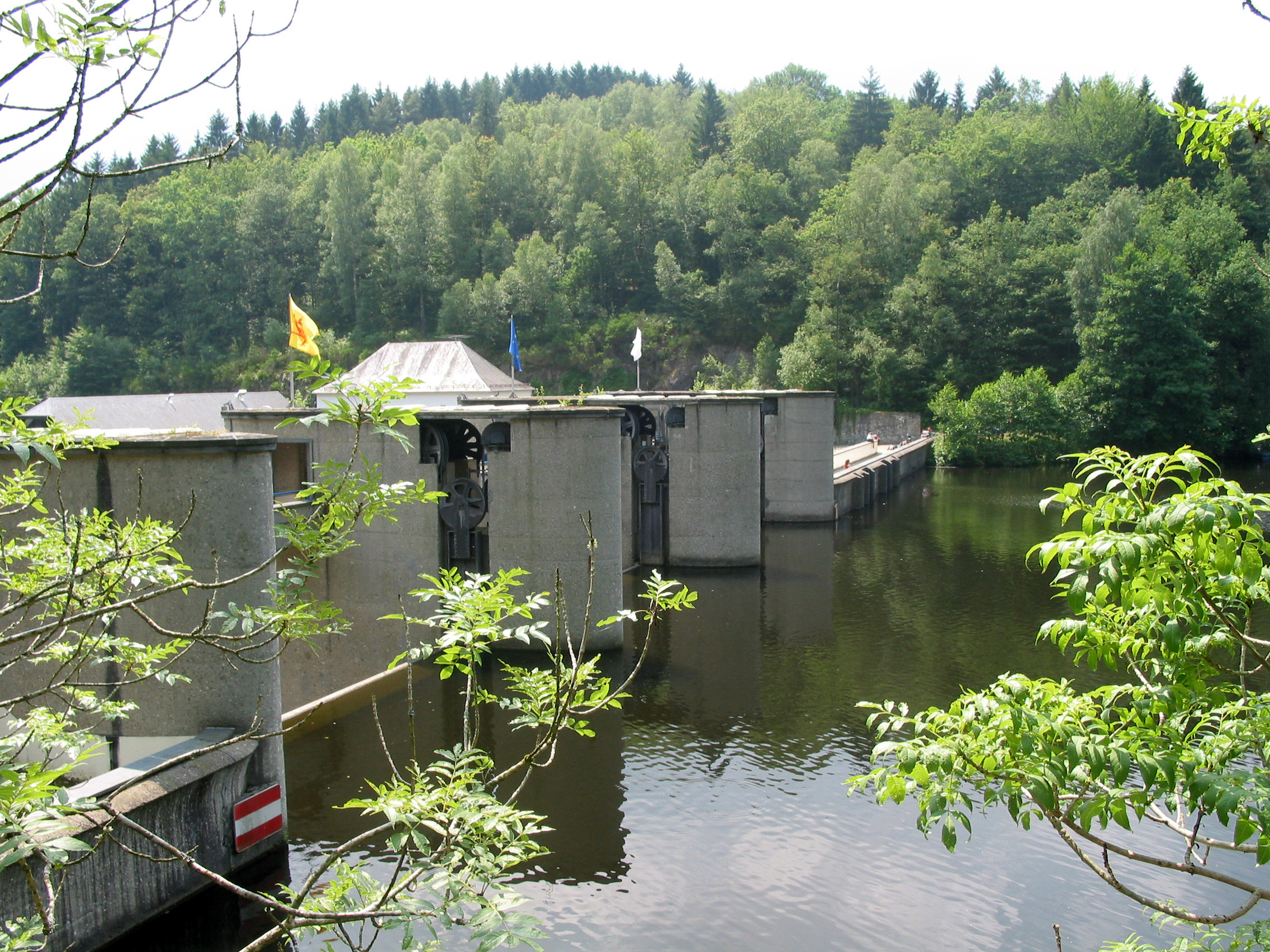
- Dam of Nisramont

- Location within Belgium
- Coordinates: 50.1445°N 5.6685°E
- Type: Freshwater artificial lake
- Basin countries: Wallonia, Belgium
- Max. length: 4 km (2.5 mi)
- Max. width: 0.1 km (0.062 mi)
- Surface area: 0.47 km^{2} (0.18 sq mi)
- Water volume: 3×10^{6} m^{3} (2,400 acre⋅ft)
- Surface elevation: 285 m (935 ft)
- Islands: 0
- Settlements: La Roche-en-Ardenne

Lake Nisramont (French: lac de Nisramont) is located in Wallonia in the south-east of Belgium on the river Ourthe in the municipality of La Roche-en-Ardenne, province of Luxembourg.

It is named after Nisramont, a village near the lake. The dam has a length of 116 m and is 16 m high. The volume of water is 3,000,000 m^{3} and the area of the lake is 0.47 km^{2}. The dam has fish ladders and a hydro-electric power station. The dam was erected at the point where the Western Ourthe (Ourthe Occidentale) and Eastern Ourthe (Ourthe Orientale) merge to form the Ourthe. The lake is a tourist attraction, with water sports, including canoeing and fishing.

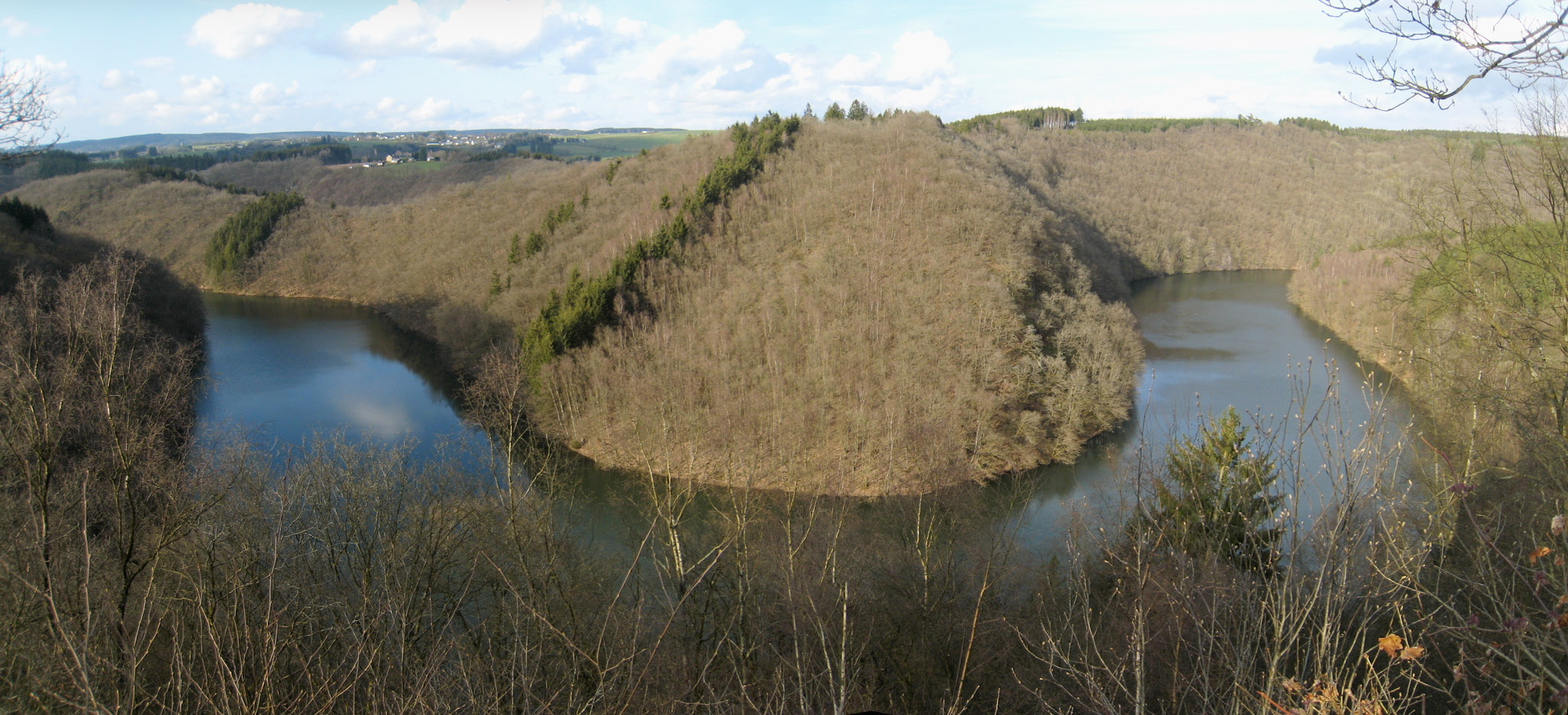
Panorama of the lake
