= Esneux =

Municipality in Liège Province, Wallonia, Belgium

Esneux Esneu (Walloon)
- Municipality
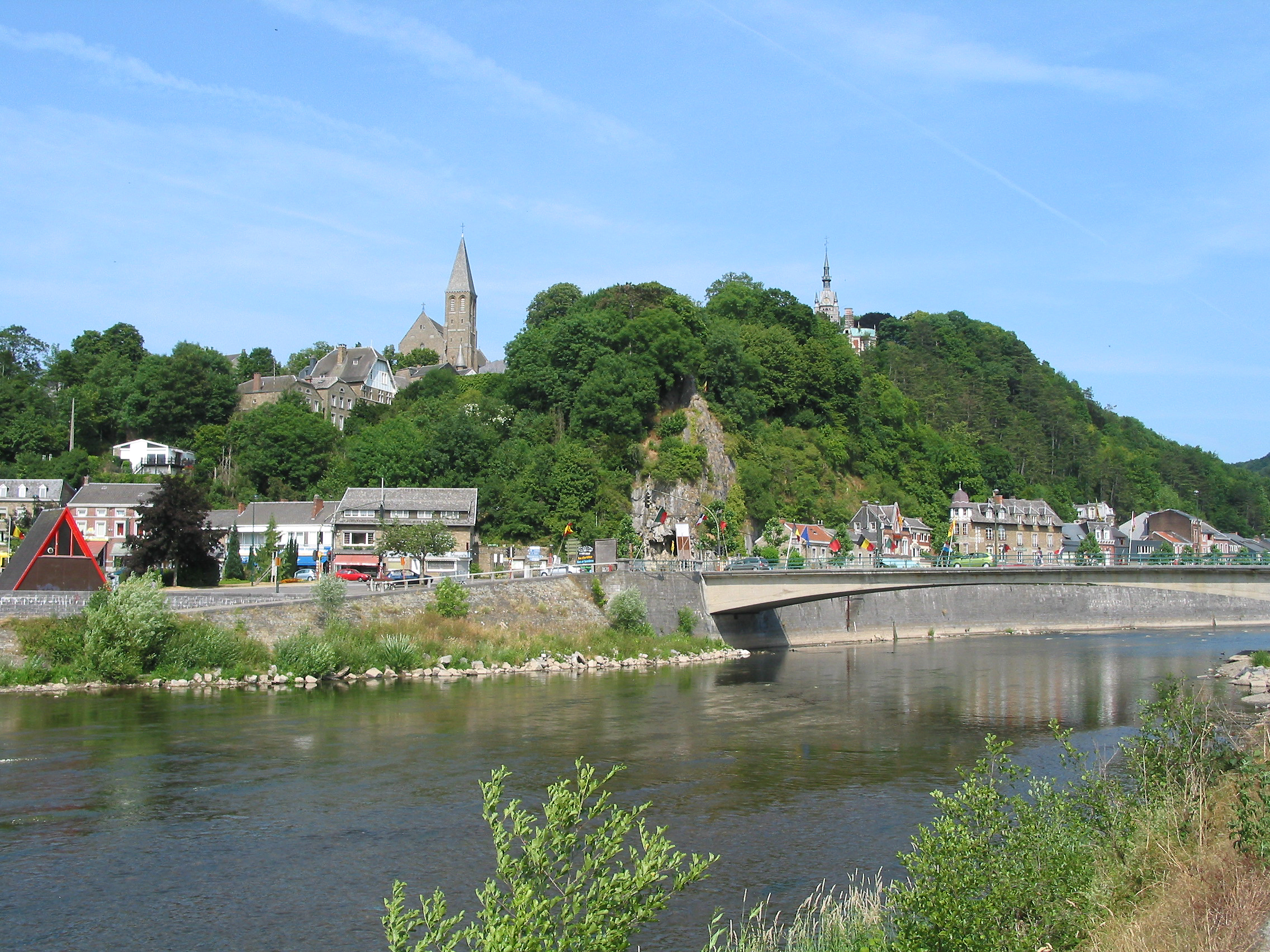

- Flag Coat of arms

- Location of Esneux in Liège province
- Interactive map of Esneux
- Location in Belgium
- Coordinates: 50°32′N 05°34′E
- Country: Belgium
- Community: French Community
- Region: Wallonia
- Province: Liège
- Arrondissement: Liège

Government
  - Mayor: Laura Iker (MR)
  - Governing parties: MR, PS

Area
  - Total: 34.13 km^{2} (13.18 sq mi)

Population (2018-01-01)
  - Total: 12,889
  - Density: 377.6/km^{2} (978.1/sq mi)
- Postal codes: 4130
- NIS code: 62032
- Area codes: 04
- Website: www.esneux.be

Esneux (French pronunciation: [ɛsnø]; Walloon: Esneu) is a municipality of Wallonia located in the province of Liège, Belgium.

On 1 January 2006 Esneux had a total population of 13,072. The total area is 34.05 km^{2} (13.15 sq mi) which gives a population density of 384 inhabitants per km^{2}.

The municipality consists of the following districts: Esneux and Tilff. Other villages are Méry and Hony. They are all to be found in the valley of the Ourthe river south of Liège. A railway line links the 4 villages (and then continues further south to Luxembourg).

Although not popular with large numbers of international tourists, Esneux and Tilff do attract people from the local region, due to the local restaurants, the Esneux and Tilff castle, the bee-museum, and several parks.

In Esneux, the largest giant sequoia of Belgium can be found.

== See also ==
- List of protected heritage sites in Esneux
- Été 67, rock band based in Esneux
- Léontine de Maësen, opera singer, born in Esneux in 1835
