= Faber Mill =

Watermill in Hotton, Belgium

Coordinates: 50.2676°N 5.4516°E

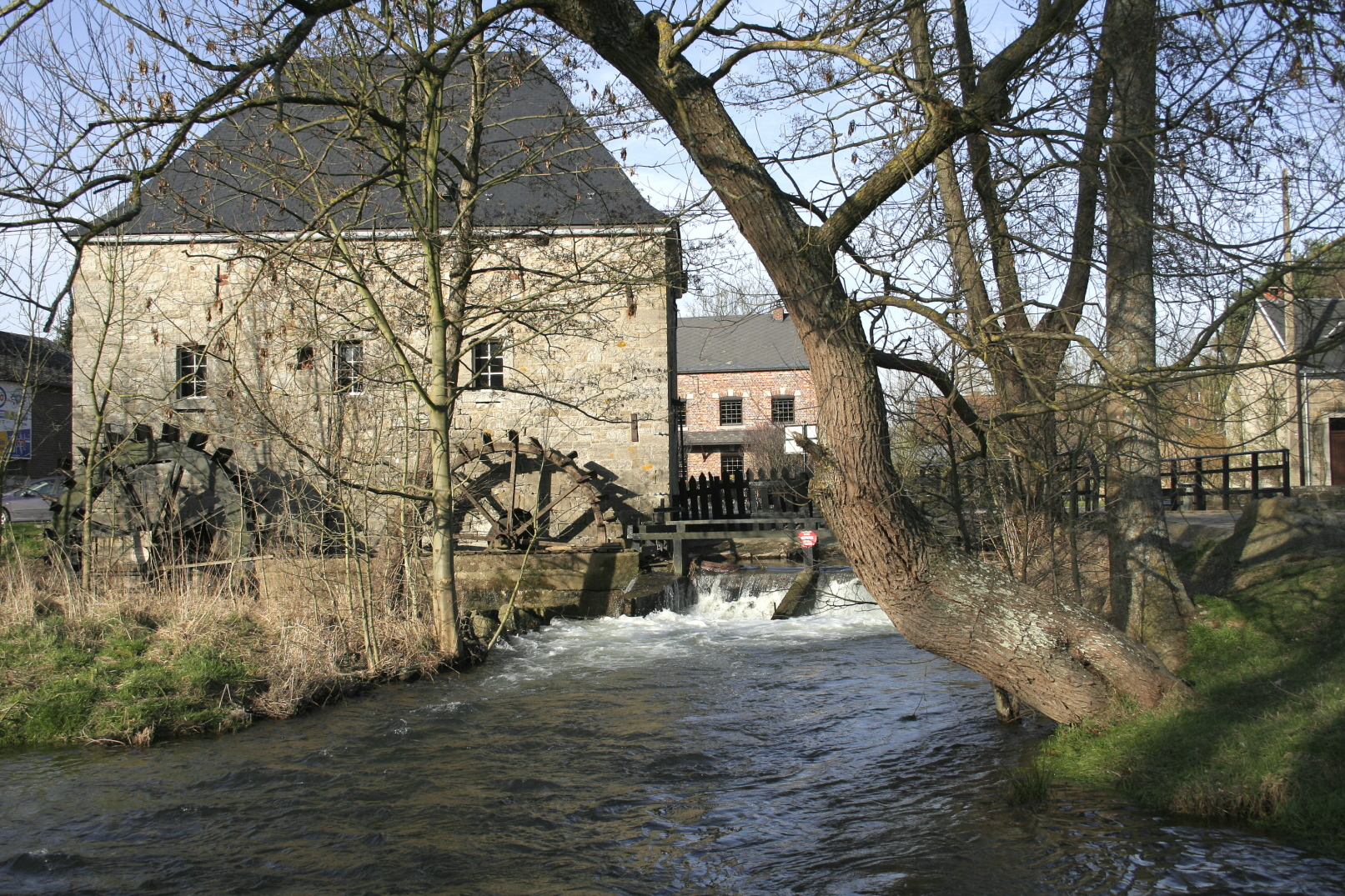
The Faber Mill

The Faber Mill (French: Moulin Faber) is a watermill in Hotton (in the Rue Haute) built in 1729. The mill is a listed building and is built from limestone with a pegged roof and is nowadays a museum. There are four levels inside the building: one level for the three mills, one for the pairs of millstones, one for the bolting and an attic. The mill has two wheels outside in a tributary of the river Ourthe. One wheel is made of wood and the other is made of metal. The mill still works for the enjoyment of tourists and produces different qualities of flour.
