= Hampteau =

Belgian village located in Wallonia

Coordinates: 50.2581°N 5.4736°E

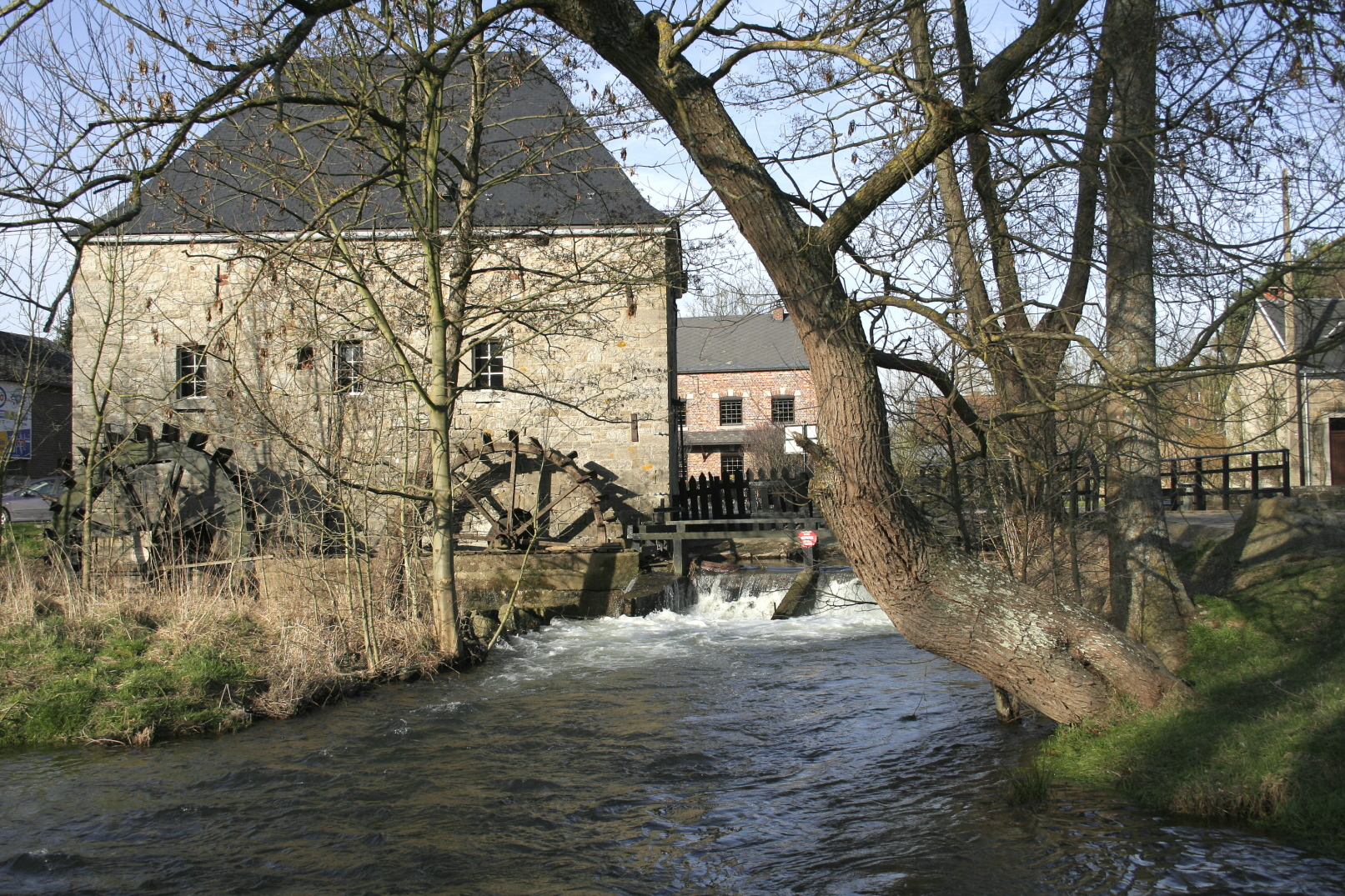
Faber Mill

Hampteau (Walloon: Hamtea) is a village of Wallonia and a district of the municipality of Hotton, located in the province of Luxembourg, Belgium.

The village lies at the south bank of the river Ourthe. It has around 300 inhabitants. Its postal code is 6990.

The 18th-century Faber Mill lies in Hampteau.
