= List of protected heritage sites in Gouvy =

This table shows an overview of the protected heritage sites in the Walloon town Gouvy. This list is part of Belgium's national heritage.

Object	Year/architect	Town/section	Address	Coordinates	Number^{?}	Image
Church of Saint-Pierre ^{(nl)} ^{(fr)}		Gouvy	Beho	50.220648°N 5.997244°E	82037-CLT-0001-01 Info	Kerk Saint-Pierre
Chapel Saint Hubert et Antoine and the ensemble of thechapel, the cemetery and the rocky promontory on the road and the river to the south and west ^{(nl)} ^{(fr)}		Gouvy	Wathermael-Beho	50.179380°N 5.980129°E	82037-CLT-0002-01 Info	Kapel Sainte-Hubert-et-Antoine en het ensemble van de genoemde kapel, de begraafplaats en de rotsachtige voorgebergte aan de weg en de rivier naar het zuiden en westen
Ensemble of the chapel of Saint-Martin and the surrounding areas ^{(nl)} ^{(fr)}		Gouvy	Bovigny	50.221171°N 5.945466°E	82037-CLT-0003-01 Info	
Church of St. Vincent ^{(nl)} ^{(fr)}		Gouvy	Cherain	50.180950°N 5.865350°E	82037-CLT-0004-01 Info	Kerk Saint-Vincent
The walls of the cemetery of the Church of St. Vincent in Cherain, whose church is classified by Royal Decree of 26 September 1947, and the buildings on the square, place de Cherain and the ensemble of buildings and surrounding areas, including the Cemetery Cherain ^{(nl)} ^{(fr)}		Gouvy		50.181110°N 5.865315°E	82037-CLT-0006-01 Info	
Building ^{(nl)} ^{(fr)}		Gouvy	rue de l'Eglise n°3, Gouvy	50.184976°N 5.942619°E	82037-CLT-0007-01 Info	
Organs of the church of the Saints Pierre et Paul ^{(nl)} ^{(fr)}		Gouvy	Steinbach	50.144713°N 5.901734°E	82037-CLT-0008-01 Info	
Castle of Steinbach ^{(nl)} ^{(fr)}		Gouvy	Gouvy	50.145173°N 5.902712°E	82037-CLT-0010-01 Info	
La Croix located on the road to Salm ^{(nl)} ^{(fr)}		Gouvy	Gouvy	50.186853°N 5.939538°E	82037-CLT-0011-01 Info	
Chapel Notre-Dame de Lourdes, and the ensemble of the chapel and its surroundings ^{(nl)} ^{(fr)}		Gouvy	Baclain	50.191919°N 5.863910°E	82037-CLT-0013-01 Info	
Mill (facades, roofs and rooms with machinery), basketry Beaupain (facades and roofs), the old bridge of the mill, the range of the mill, including the valves, the waterfall, the wheel, the sealing tunnel Cierreux and the ensemble of this building and its environment ^{(nl)} ^{(fr)}		Gouvy		50.242705°N 5.922120°E	82037-CLT-0014-01 Info	
The rectory of the parish of Saint-Martin ^{(nl)} ^{(fr)}		Gouvy	Gouvy	50.224690°N 5.917744°E	82037-CLT-0017-01 Info	
The walls of the cemetery and the road, and the ensemble of the cemetery and the road to the church ^{(nl)} ^{(fr)}		Gouvy	Gouvy	50.220542°N 5.996986°E	82037-CLT-0018-01 Info	
Tower of the church of Saint-Martin, the surrounding wall around the cemetery and the ensemble of the building and its surroundings ^{(nl)} ^{(fr)}		Gouvy	Bovigny	50.224794°N 5.918179°E	82037-CLT-0019-01 Info	
Facades and roofs of the castle of Sterpigny, and the ensemble of the castle and its surroundings ^{(nl)} ^{(fr)}		Gouvy		50.184604°N 5.883964°E	82037-CLT-0021-01 Info	
The southern part of the barn to Sterpigny of the castle, whose walls and roofs, and the old crucifix on the road were classified in the Executive Order of 16 June 1988 and the plot is an extension of the classified site with the executive decision of 16 June 1988 ^{(nl)} ^{(fr)}		Gouvy		50.184335°N 5.884113°E	82037-CLT-0022-01 Info	
Castle farm of mesnil: facades, roofs and entrance portal and the ensemble of these buildings and the surrounding areas ^{(nl)} ^{(fr)}		Gouvy	rue du Centre	50.146716°N 5.904010°E	82037-CLT-0025-01 Info	
The facades, roof and the porch of the house Caprasse and doors, interior woodwork and staircase, the cobbled courtyard, the walls and roofs of the outbuildings and adjoining farm, with the surrounding walls, the pond and the formation of the eastern boundary of cadastral plot 1070 and the ensemble of these buildings and the surrounding areas ^{(nl)} ^{(fr)}		Gouvy		50.178452°N 5.858133°E	82037-CLT-0026-01 Info	
Totality of the chapel of Saint-Roch ^{(nl)} ^{(fr)}		Gouvy	Renglez	50.167570°N 5.884702°E	82037-CLT-0028-01 Info	
North Wing Castle Steinbach ^{(nl)} ^{(fr)}		Gouvy	Limerlé	50.145338°N 5.902809°E	82037-CLT-0030-01 Info	
The uniqueness of the buffet and the organ of the church of Saints Pierre et Paul ^{(nl)} ^{(fr)}		Gouvy		50.144713°N 5.901734°E	82037-PEX-0001-01 Info	

== See also ==
- List of protected heritage sites in Luxembourg (Belgium)
- Gouvy
