= Hotton =

Municipality in Wallonia, Belgium

Hotton Houton (Walloon)
- Municipality
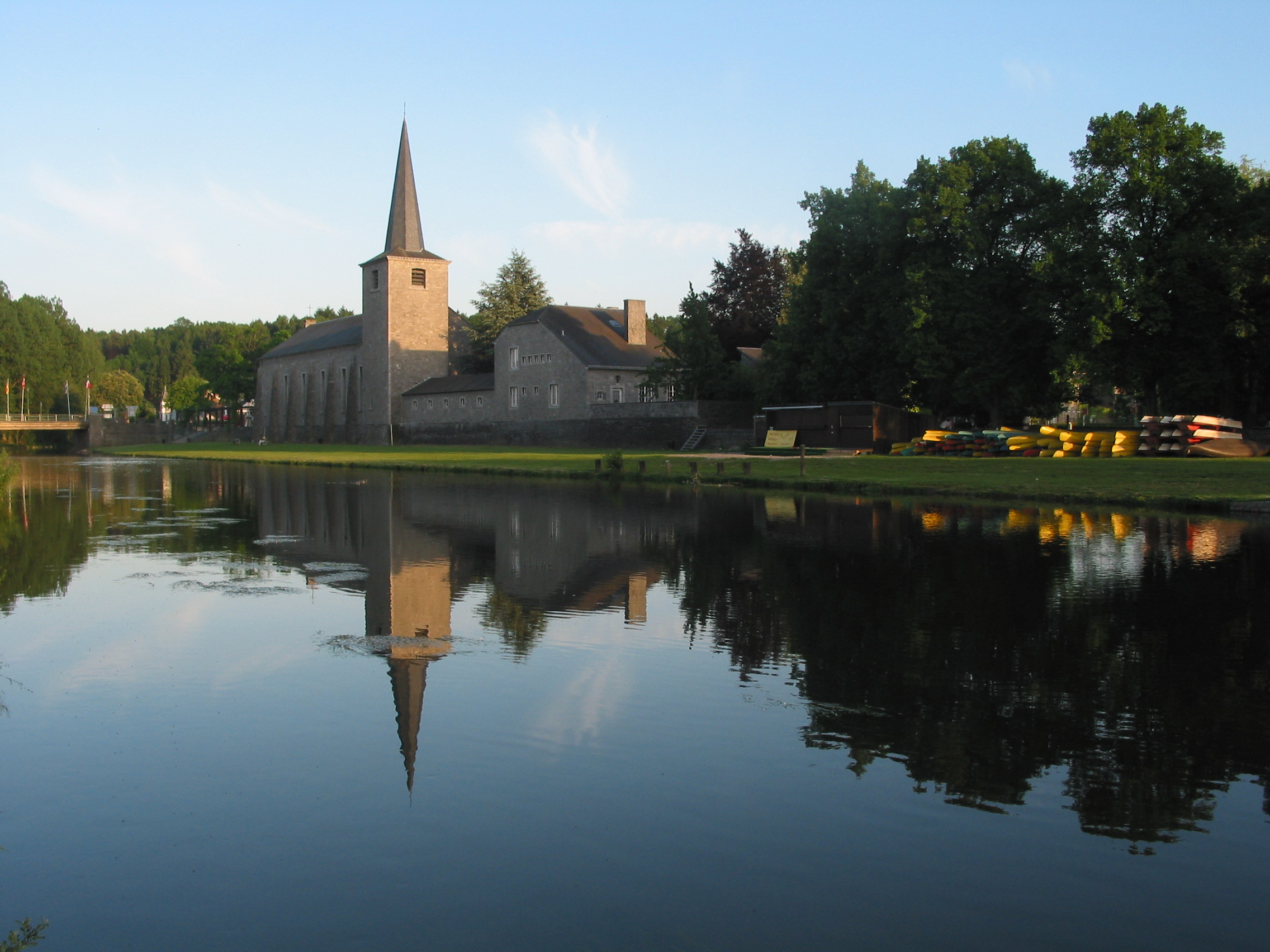
- The church.

- Flag Coat of arms

- Location of Hotton in Luxembourg province
- Interactive map of Hotton
- Location in Belgium
- Coordinates: 50°16.1′N 5°26.8′E
- Country: Belgium
- Community: French Community
- Region: Wallonia
- Province: Luxembourg
- Arrondissement: Marche-en-Famenne

Government
  - Mayor: Martine Schmit

Area
  - Total: 57.02 km^{2} (22.02 sq mi)

Population (2018-01-01)
  - Total: 5,531
  - Density: 97.00/km^{2} (251.2/sq mi)
- Postal codes: 6990
- NIS code: 83028
- Area codes: 084
- Website: (in French) www.hotton.be

Hotton (French pronunciation: [ɔtɔ̃]; Walloon: Houton) is a municipality of Wallonia located in the province of Luxembourg, Belgium. The municipality lies 12 kilometers from Marche-en-Famenne in the Ardennes and has more than 5,400 inhabitants. The river Ourthe crosses Hotton.

The municipality consists of the following districts: Hampteau, Hotton, Marenne and Fronville. There are also several hamlets: Bourdon, Deulin, Ménil-Favay, Monville, Monteuville, Melreux, Ny and Werpin.

The municipality lies in the Arrondissement of Marche-en-Famenne. In the west it borders the province of Namur.

== History ==
The first history of Hotton dates from Roman times, when Hotton was an oppidum. Multiple Roman excavations have been found at Ti-Château, a strengthened Roman encampment. The village of Hotton was first mentioned in medieval documents as Hottine in 1187. Hotton was part of the medieval county of La Roche till the 16th century, when it was taken over by the lords of Montaigu. In 1791, Hotton became a free village.

In the afternoon of 11 May 1940, Hotton was captured and occupied by the 5th Panzer Division during the Battle of Belgium. Allied forces tried in vain to blow up the steel bridge over the Ourthe in an attempt to slow down German forces. Hotton played an important role during the Battle of the Bulge, as German troops (116th Panzer Division Der Windhund and the 560th Volksgrenadier Division) reached here the most western point of their advance, being stopped by the American 84th Infantry Division Railsplitters.

The current municipality was founded in 1977, when the municipalities of Hampteau, Fronville and Marenne were added to the municipality of Hotton.

The Hotton War Cemetery is home to British World War II war dead.

== Tourism ==
Hotton is a very popular place with tourists and is known for its speleothem caves, known as the Caves of Hotton. A small Commonwealth war cemetery with 660 graves is also situated just outside Hotton, Hotton War Cemetery. Other tourist attractions are Deulin Castle, the Virgin of Werpin, the Faber Mill, St. Peter's Church, Melreux and Riveo Centre.

The well-known annual hot air balloon festival Hottolfiades is held in August. The annual fair (also held in August) claims to be the largest fair of the arrondissement.

== Politics ==
Party	10-10-1976		10-10-1982		9-10-1988		9-10-1994		8-10-2000		8-10-2006		14-10-2012	
Votes / Representatives	%	13	%	13	%	15	%	15	%	15	%	17	%	17
PS	-		16,18	1	-		-		-		-		-	
PRL-MCC	-		-		-		-		15,83	2	-		-	
MR	-		-		-		-		-		13,91	2	-	
E.C.	43,55	6	41,33	6	31,81	5	34,93	5	23,63	3	28,26	5	42,61	8
IC	38,96	5	-		-		-		-		4,75	0	-	
UDP	17,49	2	-		-		-		-		-		-	
V.E.	-		42,49	6	18,49	2	-		-		-		-	
UNION	-		-		27,97	5	27,65	4	-		-		-	
ALT.88	-		-		21,73	3	-		-		-		-	
AIC	-		-		-		37,42	6	-		-		-	
MAYEUR	-		-		-		-		48,3	9	53,08	10	36,58	7
CCH	-		-		-		-		12,24	1	-		-	
FNW	-		-		-		-		-		-		2,82	0
U.C.	-		-		-		-		-		-		16,05	2
V. Ensemble	-		-		-		-		-		-		1,94	0
Total no. of votes	2221		2716		2930		3094		3381		3548		3745	
Upswing %					95,6		95,91		95,83		96,75		93,48	
Blank and invalid votes %	1,89		4,86		4,2		5,07		6		5,75		5,18	

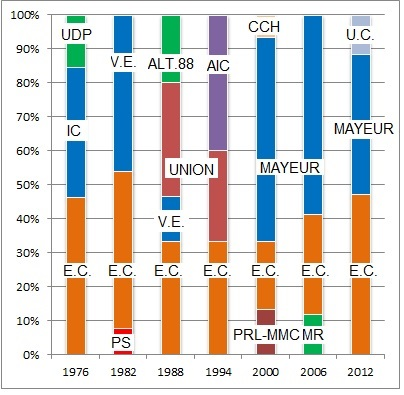

Former mayor Phillipe Courard (MAYEUR), who was mayor between 1995 and 2012, was beaten at the 2012 Belgian local elections after being mayor for seventeen years. He was replaced by Jacques Chaplier of the Entente Communale (E.C.).

== Notable residents ==
- Guillaume de Waha-Baillonville (1615–1690), historian (born in Melreux)
- Camille Mogenet (1910–1941), born in Melreux, district of Hotton, resistance fighter against National Socialism

== See also ==
- List of protected heritage sites in Hotton
