= Gouvy =

Municipality in Wallonia, Belgium

Gouvy: Gouvi (Walloon)
- Municipality
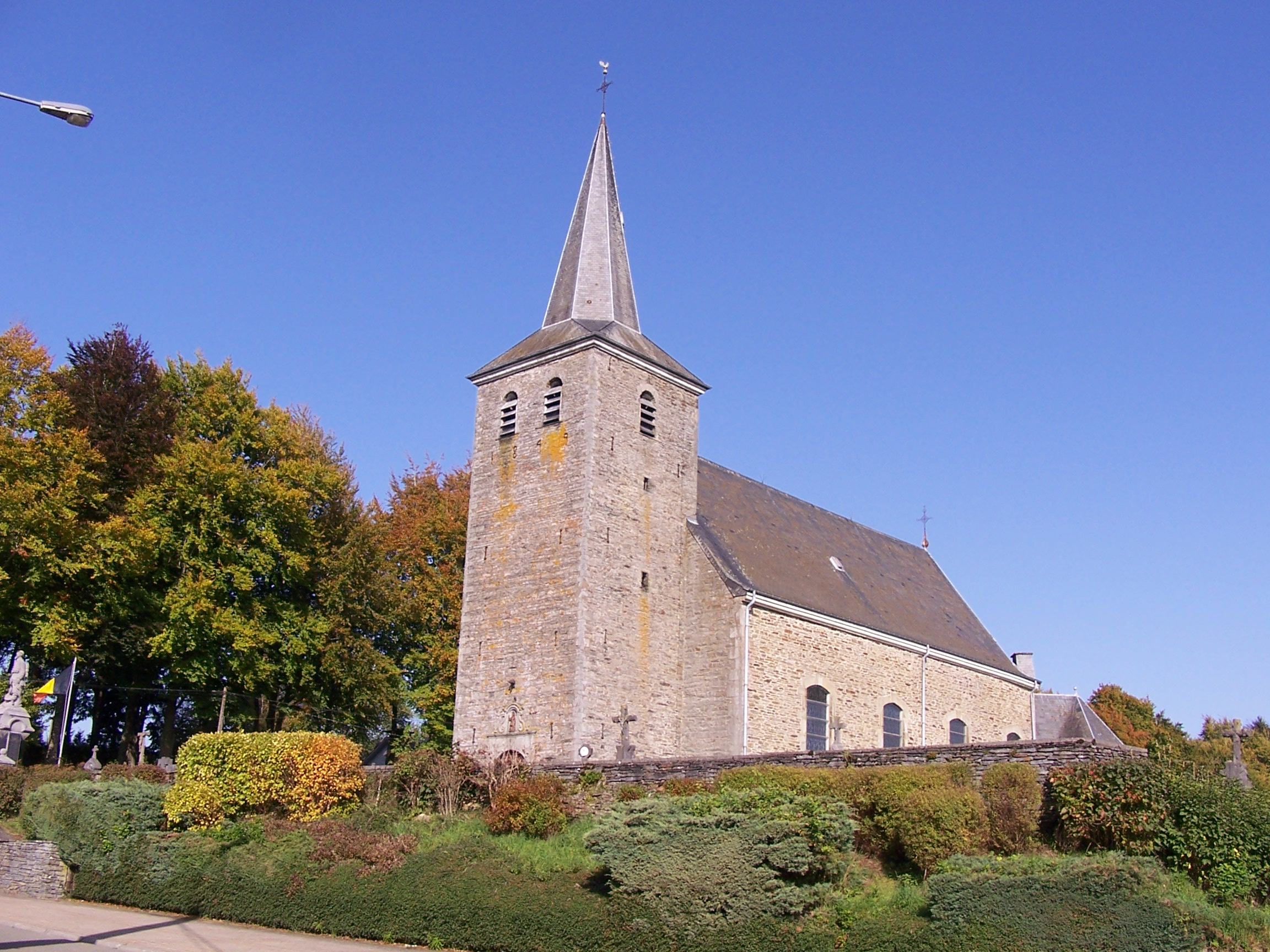
- Gouvy church

- Flag Coat of arms

- Location of Gouvy in Luxembourg province
- Interactive map of Gouvy
- Location in Belgium
- Coordinates: 50°11′N 05°56′E
- Country: Belgium
- Community: French Community
- Region: Wallonia
- Province: Luxembourg
- Arrondissement: Bastogne

Government
  - Mayor: Véronique Leonard (cdH)
  - Governing party: Horizon Neuf

Area
  - Total: 165.35 km^{2} (63.84 sq mi)

Population (2018-01-01)
  - Total: 5,206
  - Density: 31.48/km^{2} (81.55/sq mi)
- Postal codes: 6670-6674
- NIS code: 82037
- Area codes: 080
- Website: www.gouvy.be

Gouvy (French pronunciation: [ɡuvi]; Walloon: Gouvi) is a municipality of Wallonia located in the province of Luxembourg, Belgium.

On 1 January 2007 the municipality, which covers 165.11 km^{2}, had 4,780 inhabitants, giving a population density of 29 inhabitants per km^{2}.

The municipality consists of the following districts: Beho, Bovigny, Cherain, Limerlé, and Montleban. Villages in the municipality include Baclain, Bistain, Brisy, Cherapont, Cierreux, Courtil, Deiffelt, Halconreux, Halonru, Honvelez, Langlire, Lomré, Ourthe, Rettigny, Rogery, Steinbach, Sterpigny, Vaux and Wathermal. The administrative headquarters are situated in Bovigny.

The Ourthe Orientale river originates in the municipality of Gouvy, near the hamlet of Ourthe.

== Transportation ==
Gouvy railway station is served by intercity trains between Liège and Luxembourg. Gouvy used to be a railway junction, with connections towards Bastogne and Sankt-Vith. The line towards Sankt-Vith was dismantled in the 1960s. Passenger traffic to Bastogne was stopped in 1984, and the railway tracks have been converted to a RAVeL cycle/pedestrian path.

== See also ==
- List of protected heritage sites in Gouvy
