= Caves of Hotton =

Speleothem caves near Hotton in Belgium

Coordinates: 50.2592°N 5.4559°E

The Caves of Hotton are speleothem caves located in Wallonia near Hotton in Belgium, which were discovered in 1958 and are around 5 or 6 km long and 70 metres deep. A stream called Syphon runs at the bottom of the caves.

== Gallery ==
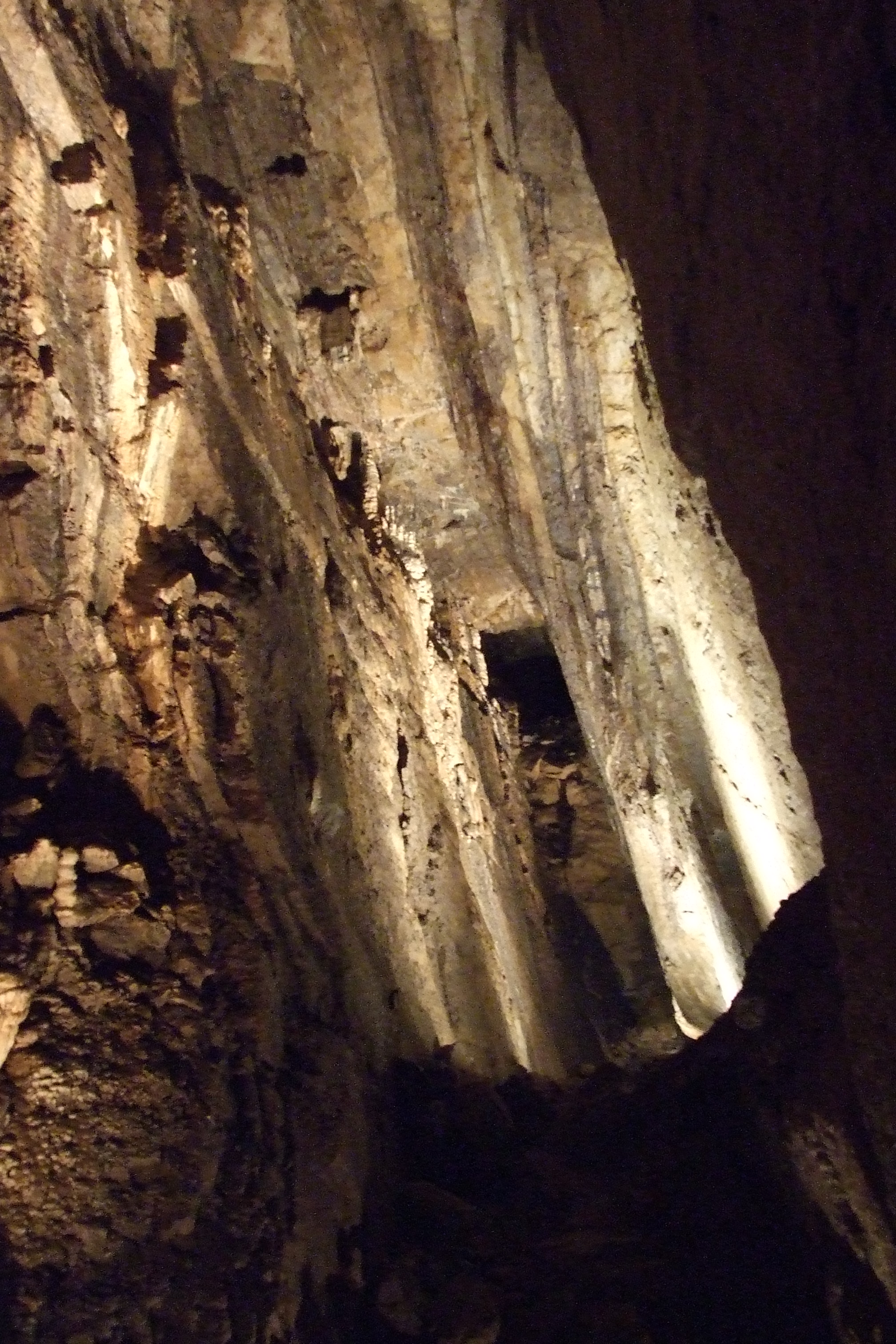

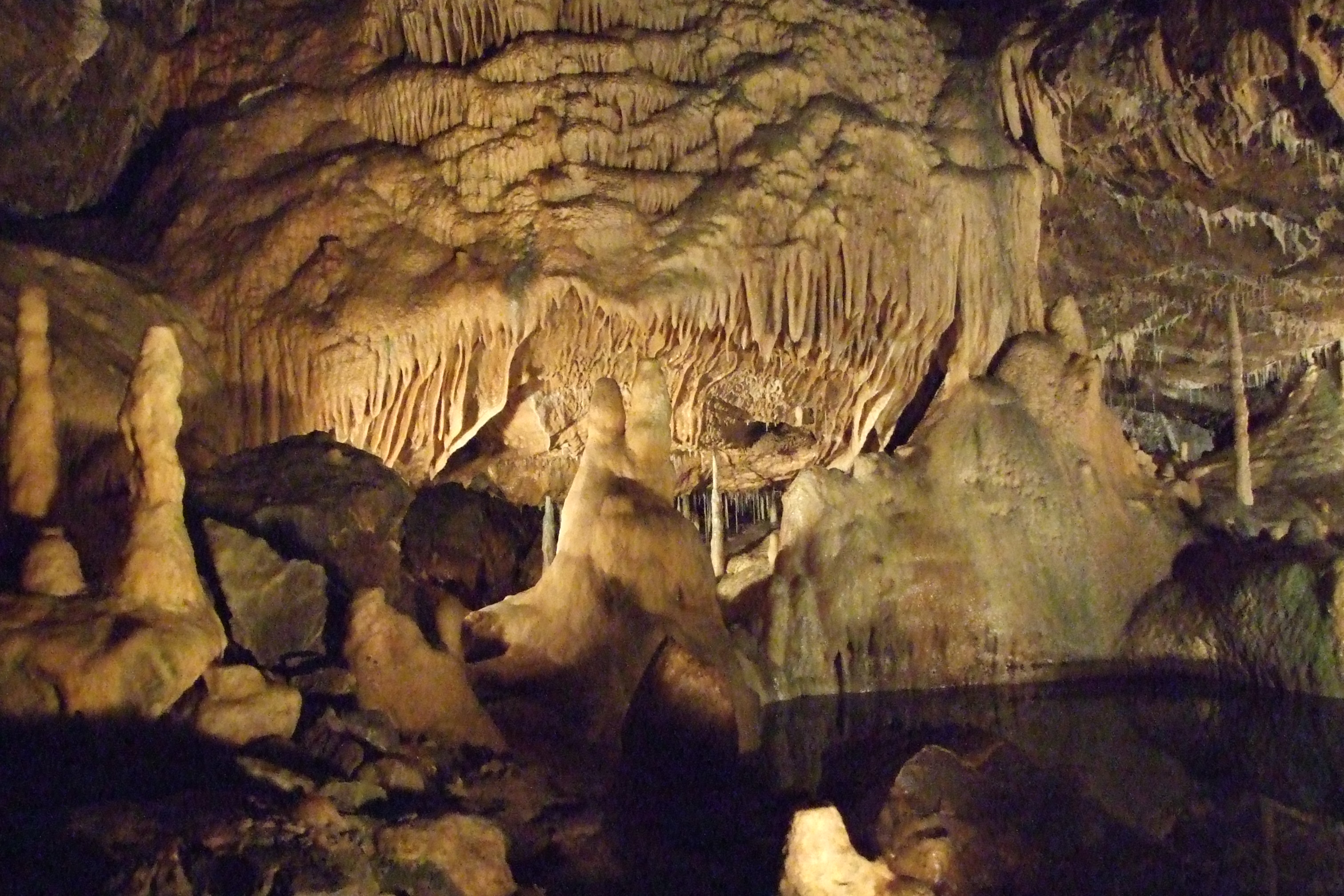

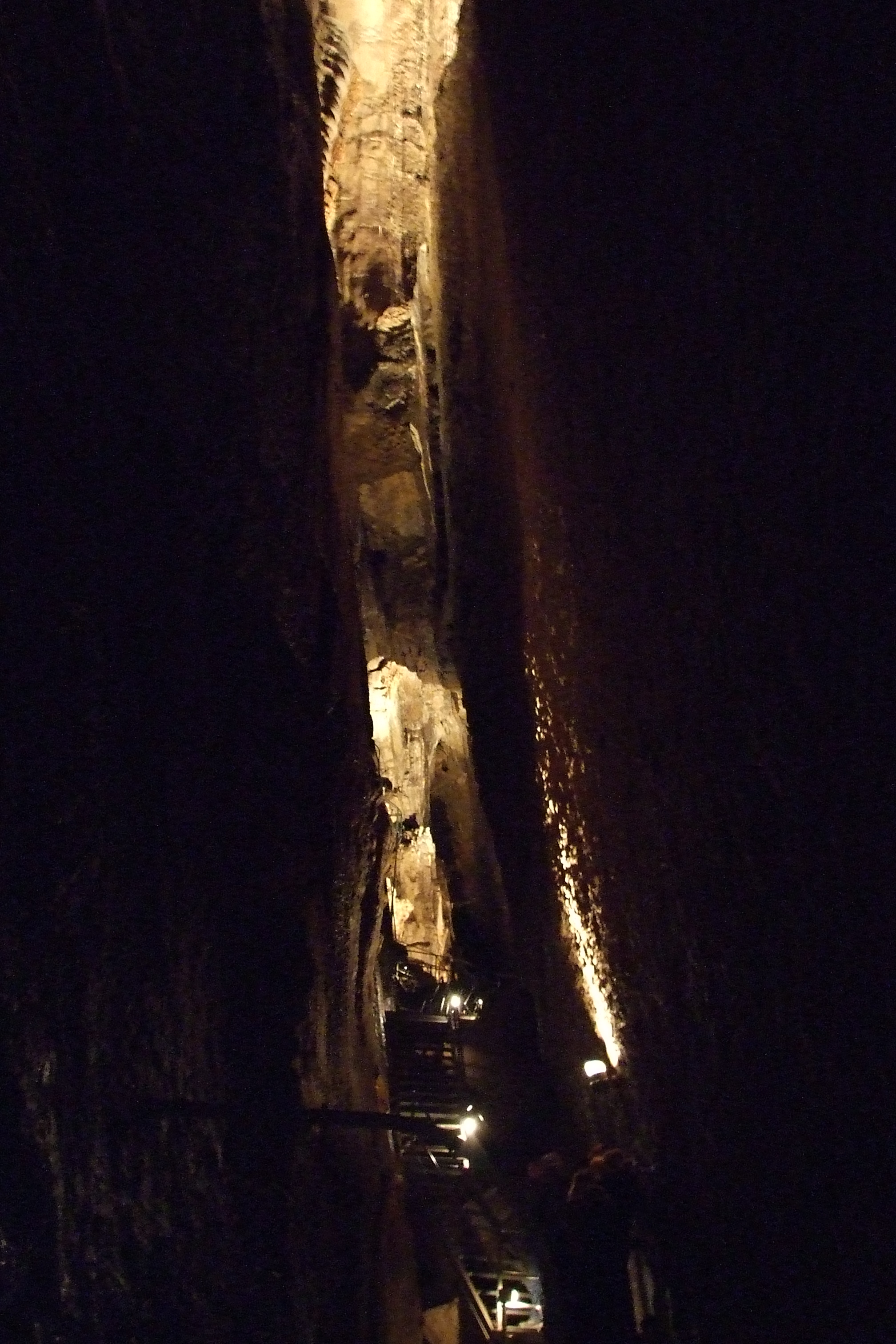

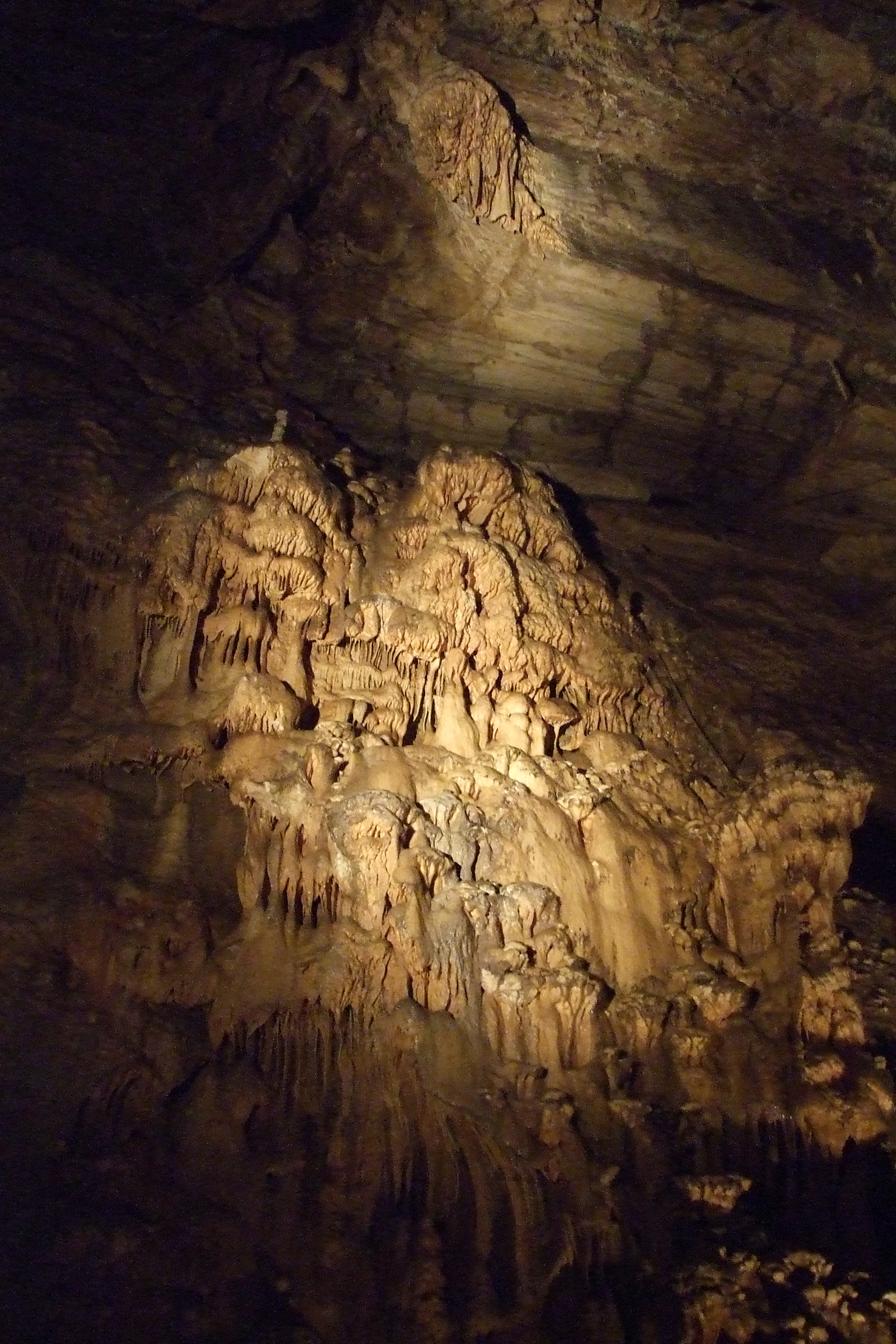

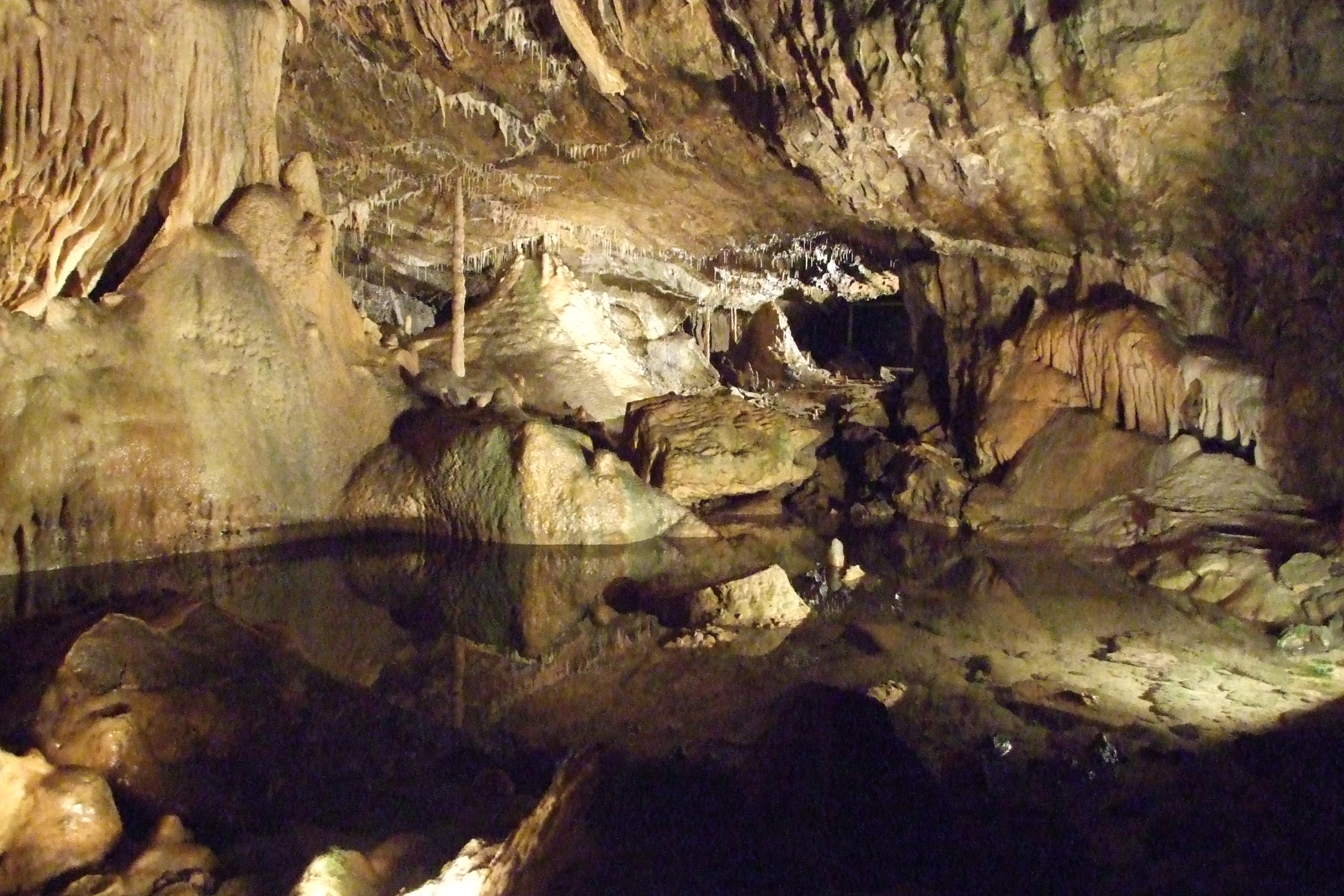
