= Deulin Castle =

Château in Wallonia, Belgium

Coordinates: 50.303°N 5.400°E

- Belgium
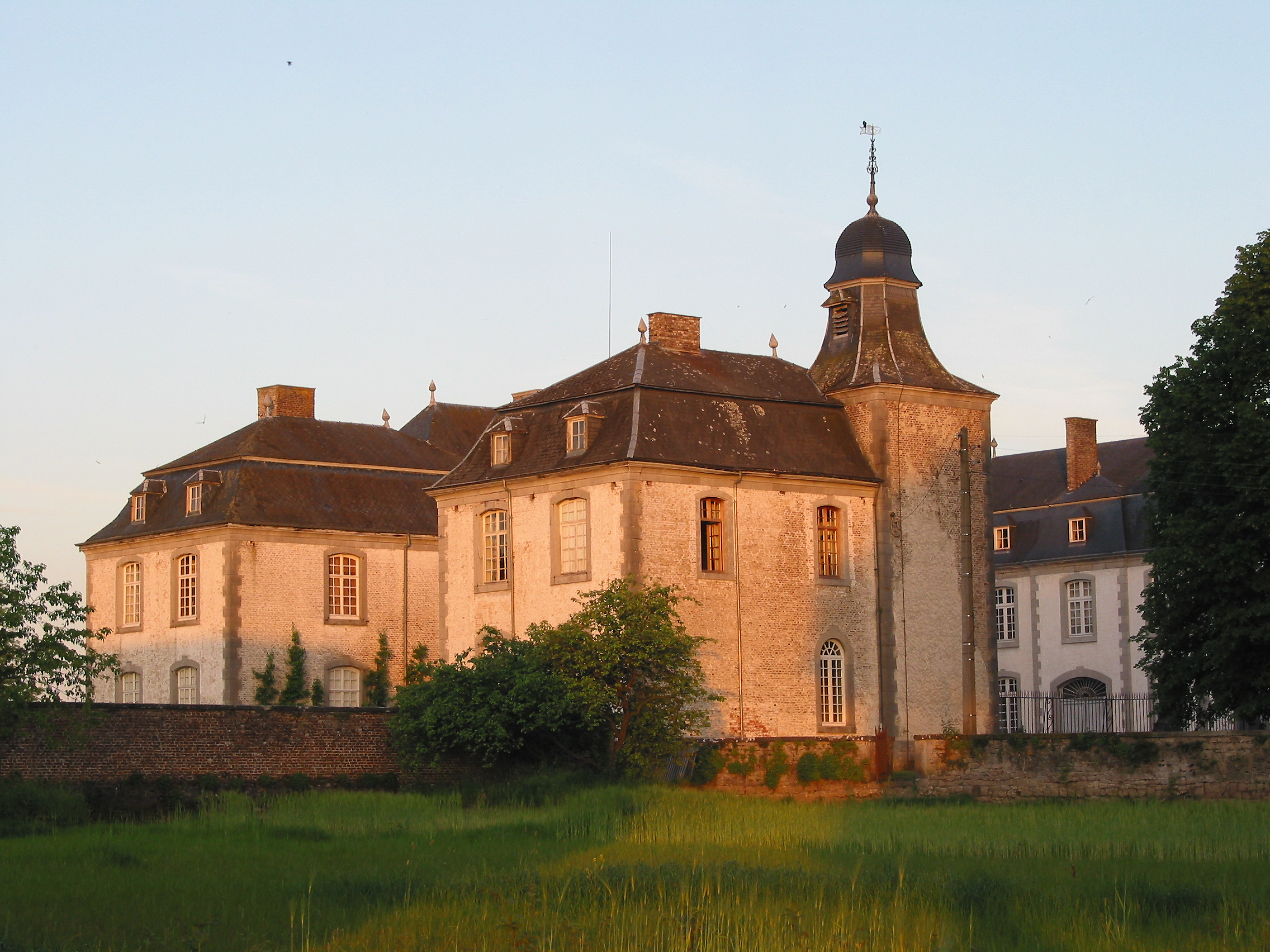

Site information
- Type: Castle

Deulin Castle (French: Château de Deulin, also Château de Harlez) is a château in the village of Deulin, which forms part of the commune of Hotton, in the province of Luxembourg, Wallonia, Belgium.

It was built from 1758 to 1770 by Guillaume-Joseph de Harlez, and his son Simon-Joseph, and their descendants, the de Harlez de Deulin family, still live there.

== See also ==
- List of castles in Belgium
- Deulin Village

== Sources ==
- Château de Deulin website
- Château gardens and arboretum
