= Ourthe =

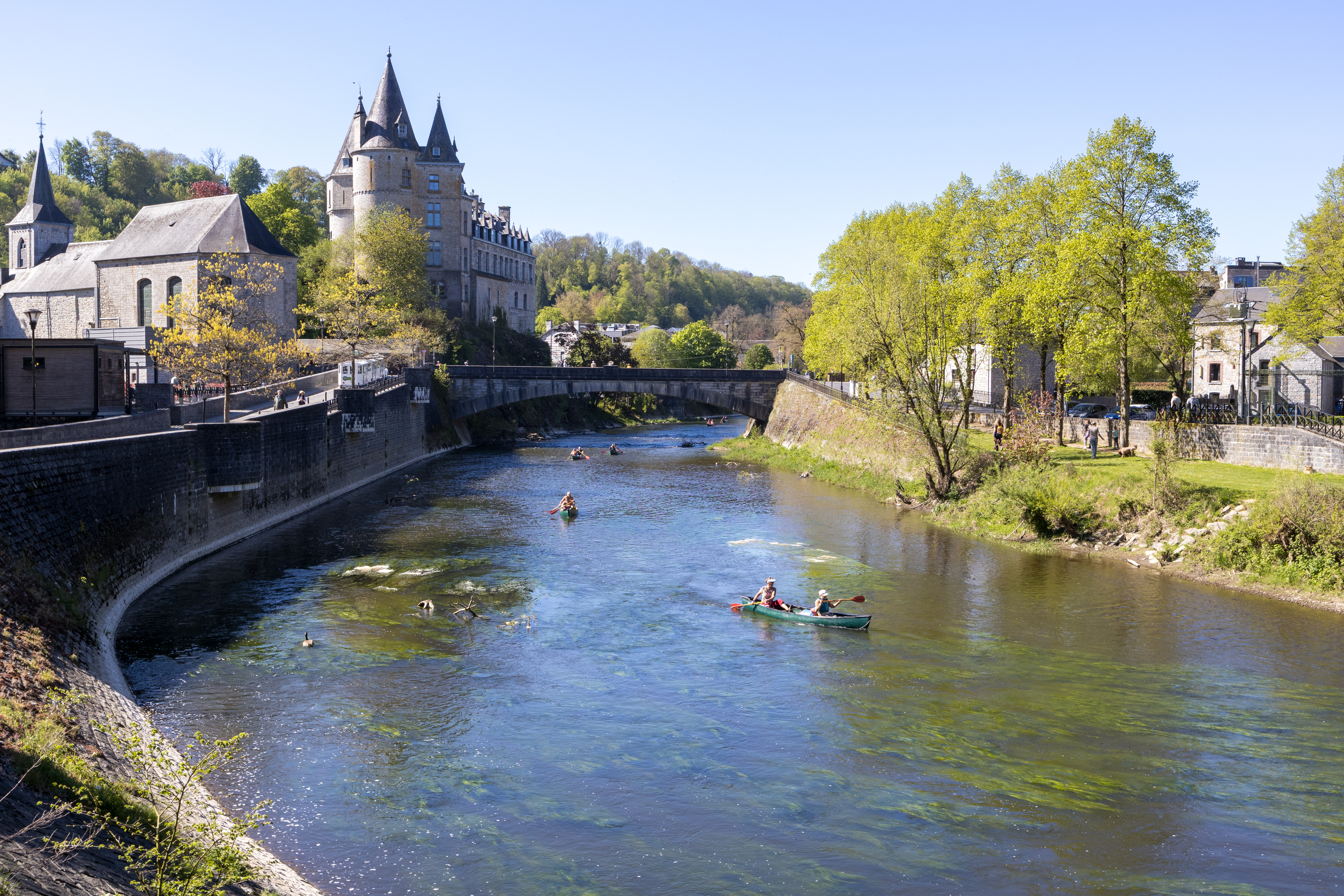

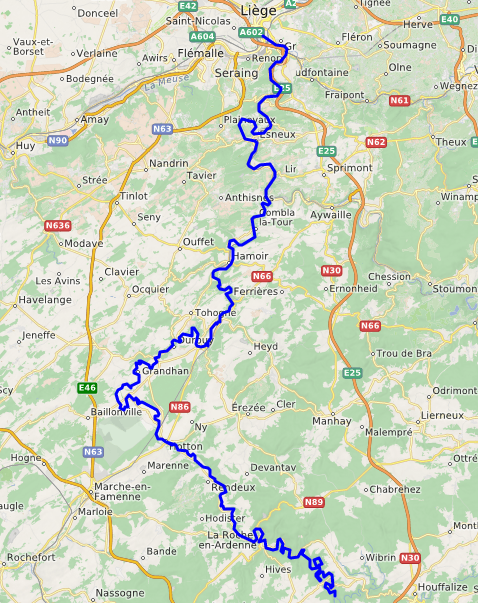
- Course of the Ourthe

Location
- Country: Belgium

Physical characteristics
- Source
  - location: Confluence of the Ourthe Occidentale and the Ourthe Orientale
  - coordinates: 50.1335°N 5.6781°E
- Mouth
  - location: Meuse
  - coordinates: 50.6228°N 5.5802°E

Basin features
- Progression: Meuse→ North Sea
- Tributaries
  - right: Amblève, Vesdre

The Ourthe (French pronunciation: [uʁt]; Walloon: Aiwe d' Oûte) is a river in the Ardennes in Wallonia, Belgium. It is 165-kilometre (103 mi) long.

== River ==
It is a right tributary to the river Meuse. The Ourthe is formed at the confluence of the Ourthe Occidentale (Western Ourthe) and the Ourthe Orientale (Eastern Ourthe), west of Houffalize.

The source of the Ourthe Occidentale is near Libramont-Chevigny, in the Belgian province Luxembourg. The source of the Ourthe Orientale is near Gouvy, also in the Belgian province Luxembourg, close to the border with Luxembourg.

After the confluence of the two Ourthes at Lake Nisramont, the Ourthe flows roughly in north-west and later in northern direction. Near Noiseux it flows for a short distance through the province of Namur. After the municipality of Durbuy it flows into Liège Province. Eventually it flows into the river Meuse in the city of Liège. The most important tributaries of the river Ourthe are the Amblève and the Vesdre. Towns along the Ourthe are Houffalize (Ourthe Orientale), La Roche-en-Ardenne, Hotton, Durbuy, Hamoir and Esneux.

Near Hotton, the caves of Hotton are located. In these caves runs a subterranean river which flows in the Ourthe.

Near Esneux lies the Roche aux Faucons. This is a vantage point located on a high cliff, above a meander of the Ourthe. In the south, near Marcourt, there is another high cliff where the Hermitage and chapel of Saint-Thibaut is located.

Around 1820, William I of the Netherlands demanded the creation of the Ourthe channel. Via the Ourthe, this channel would have connected the Meuse basin with the Moselle basin. Belgium's independence in 1830 put an end to these plans. The main remnant of these works is the unfinished channel tunnel in Bernistap (province of Luxembourg).

== See also ==
- Département de l'Ourthe

== Gallery ==
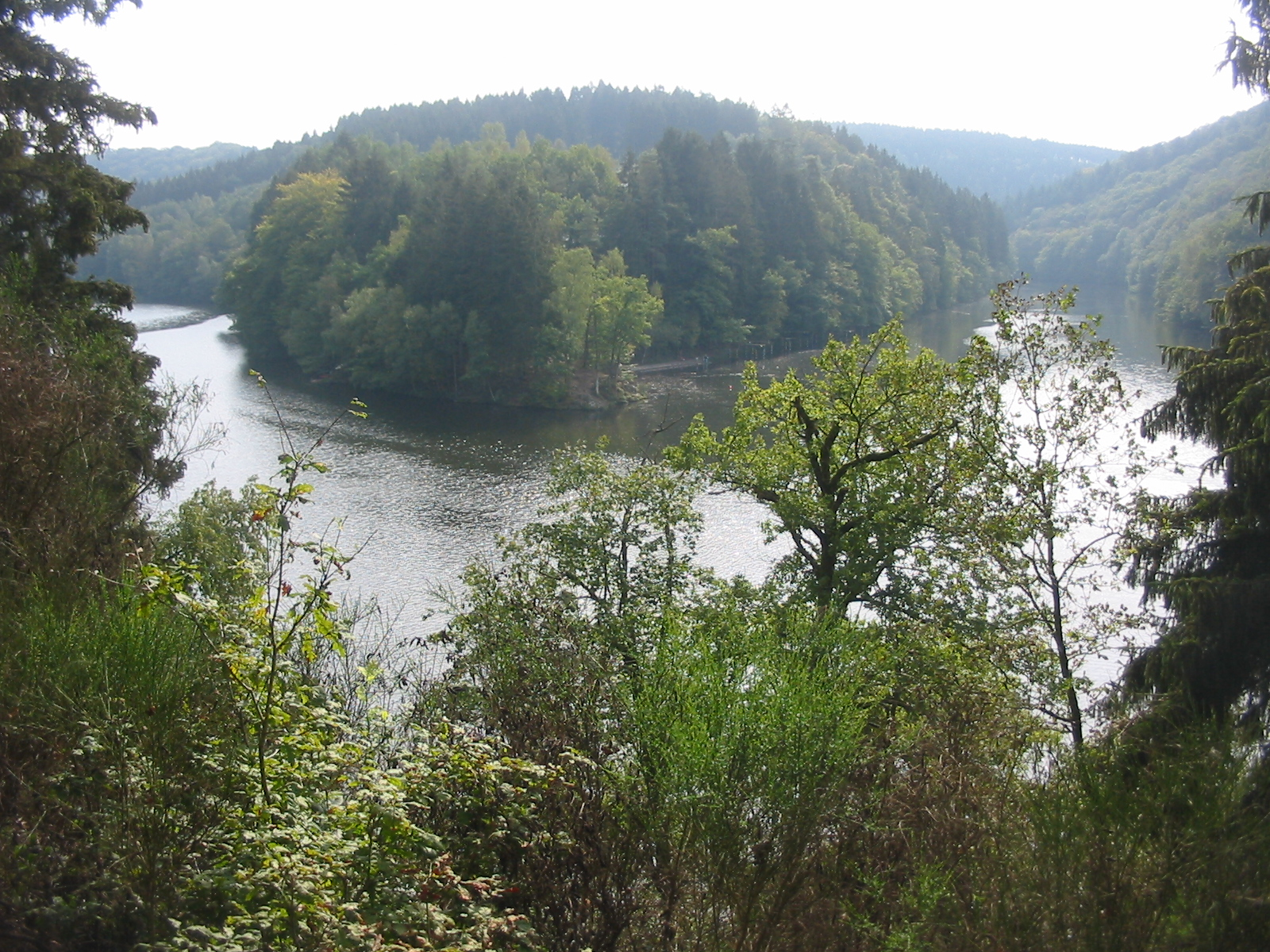
Confluence of the Ourthe Occidentale (Western Ourthe) and the Ourthe Orientale (Eastern Ourthe)

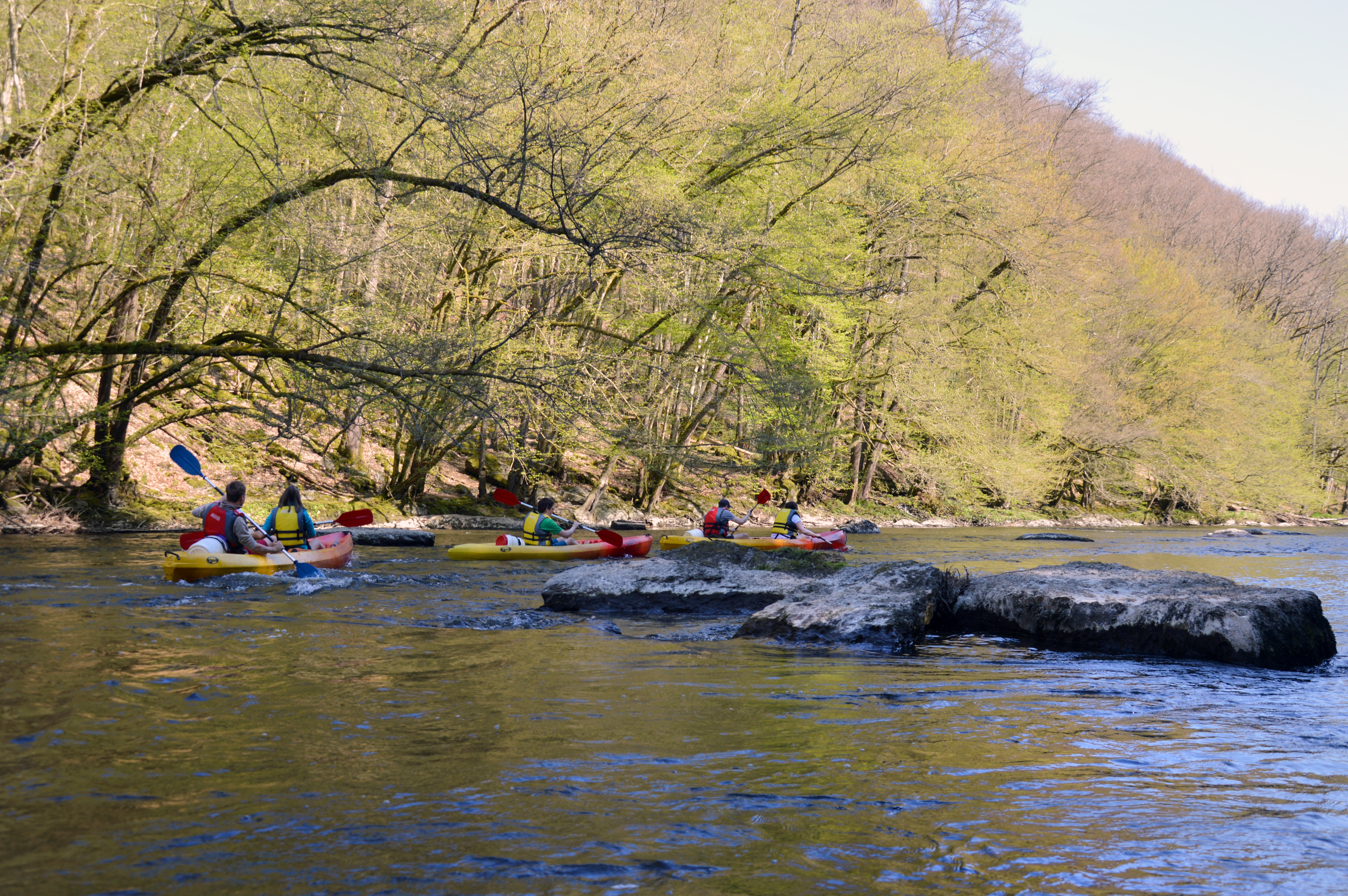
Kayakers on the Ourthe near Nadrin

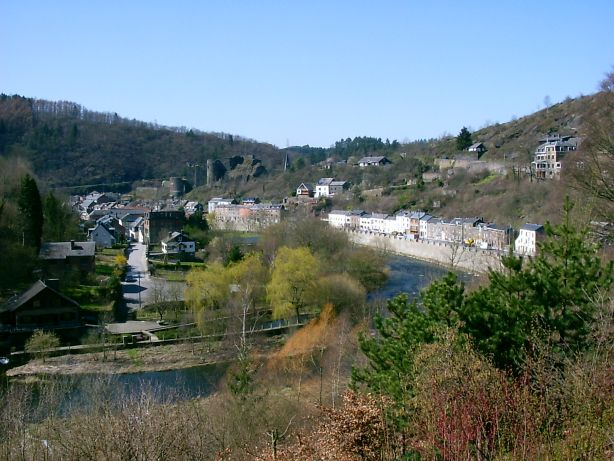
The river in La Roche-en-Ardenne

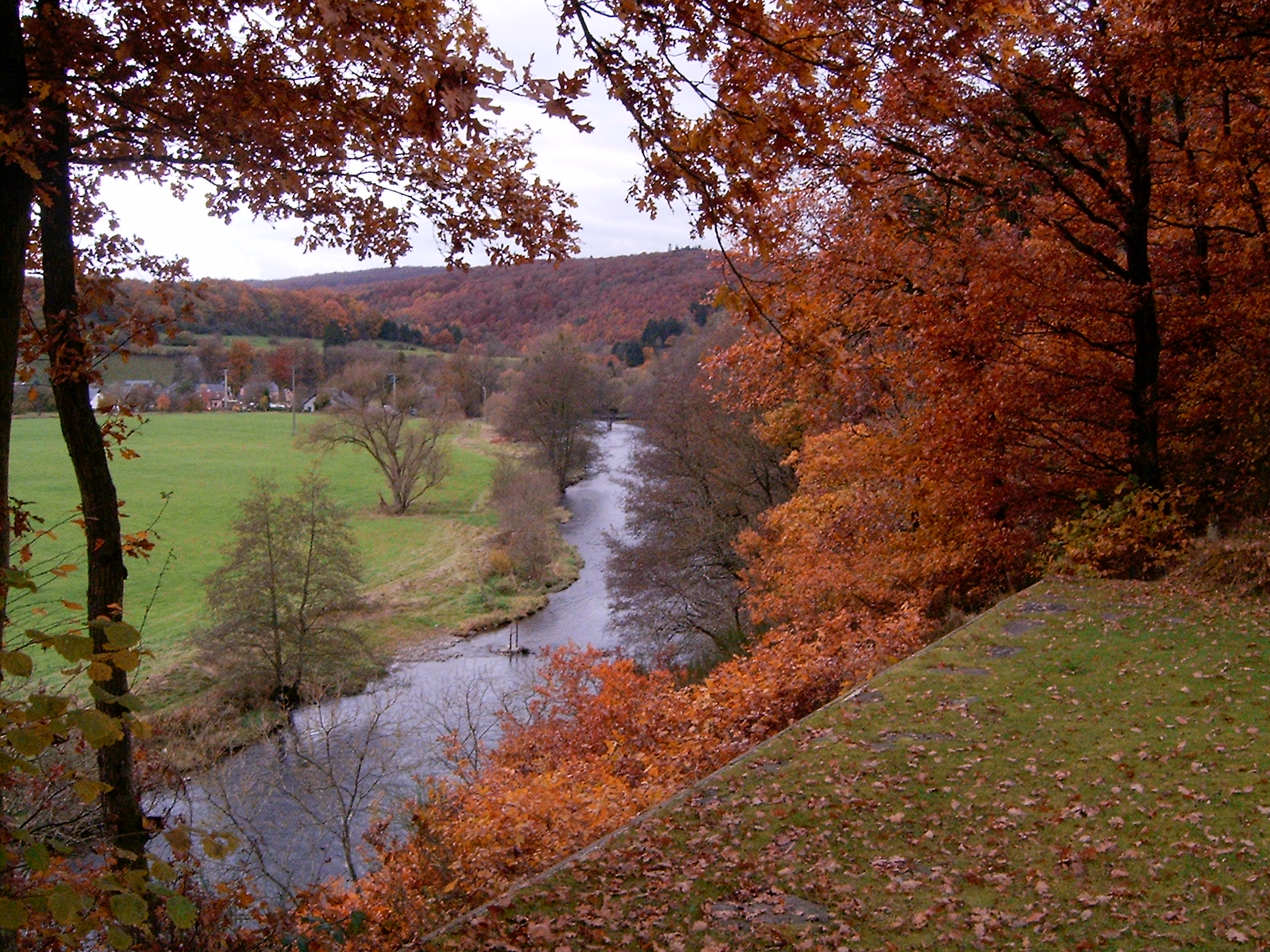
The Ourthe near Beffe in autumn

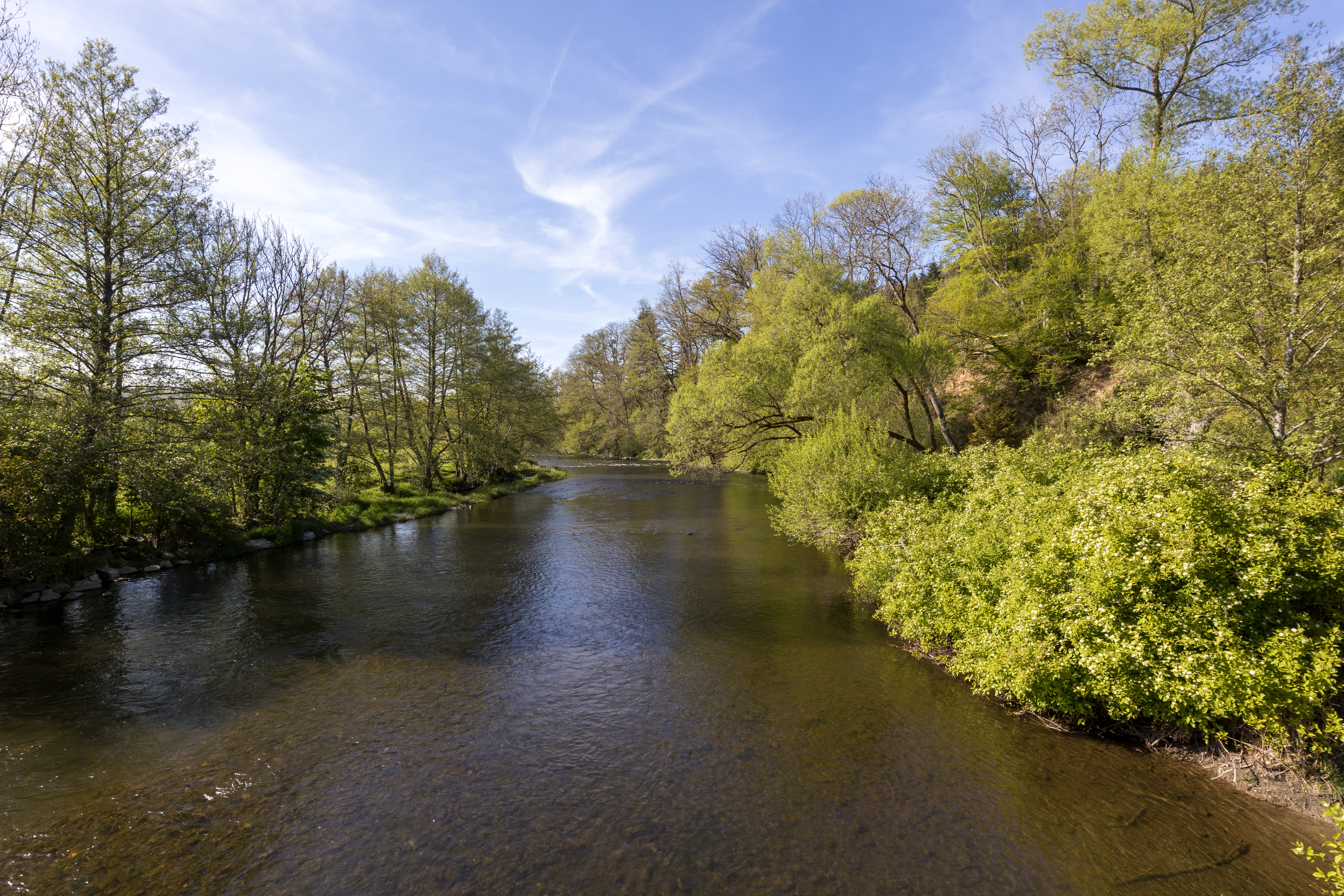
The Robert Lenoir Arboretum near Rendeux alongside the Ourthe

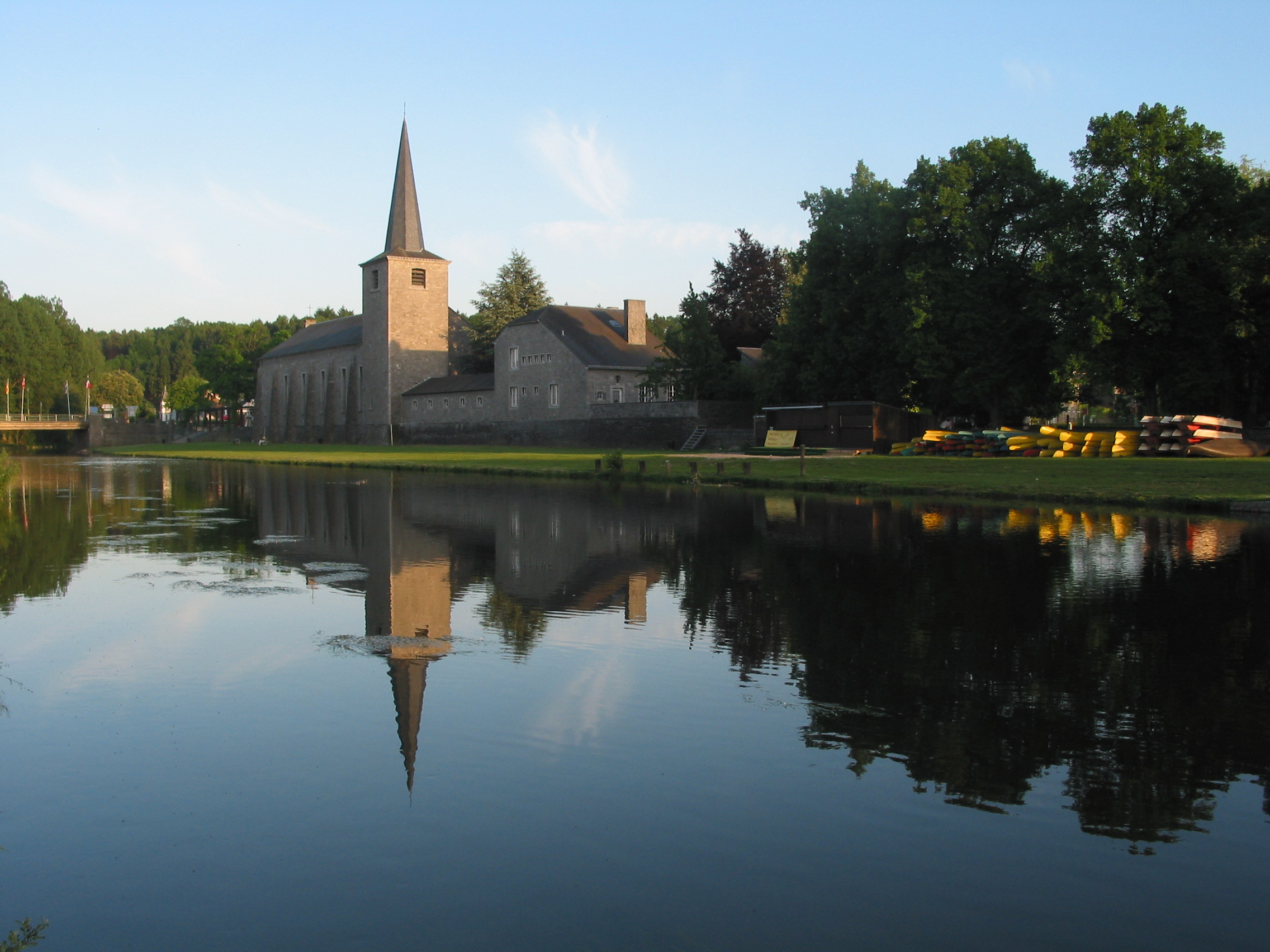
The river at Hotton, and a view of the city church

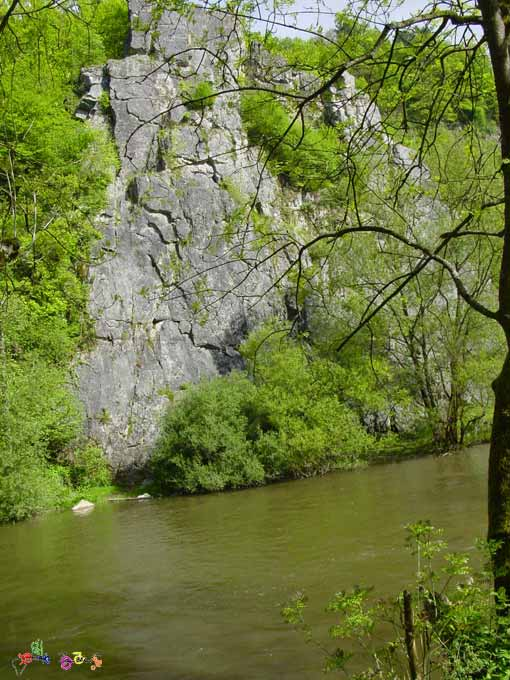
Rocks at the Ourthe near Sy

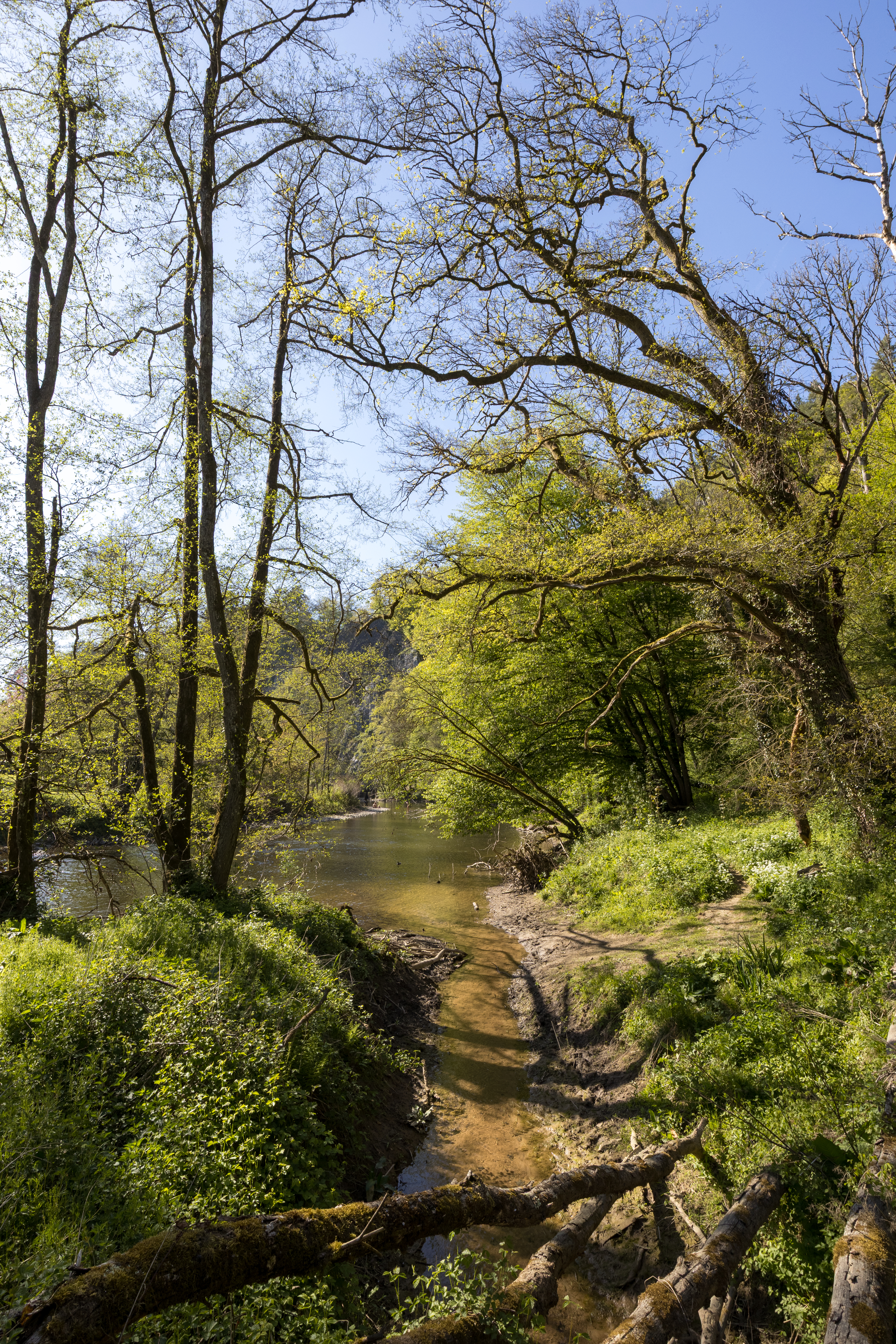

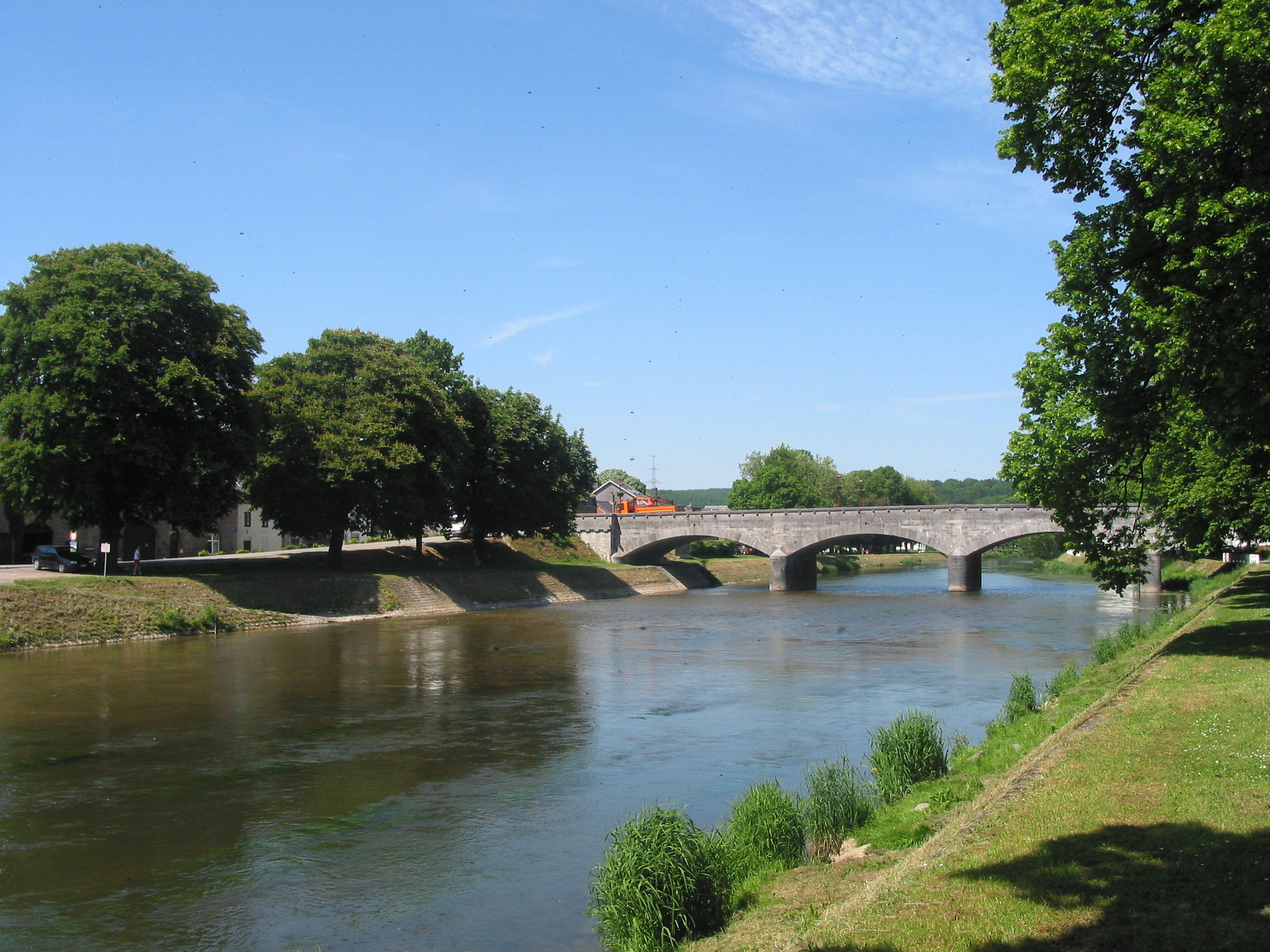
Bridge across the river at Hamoir

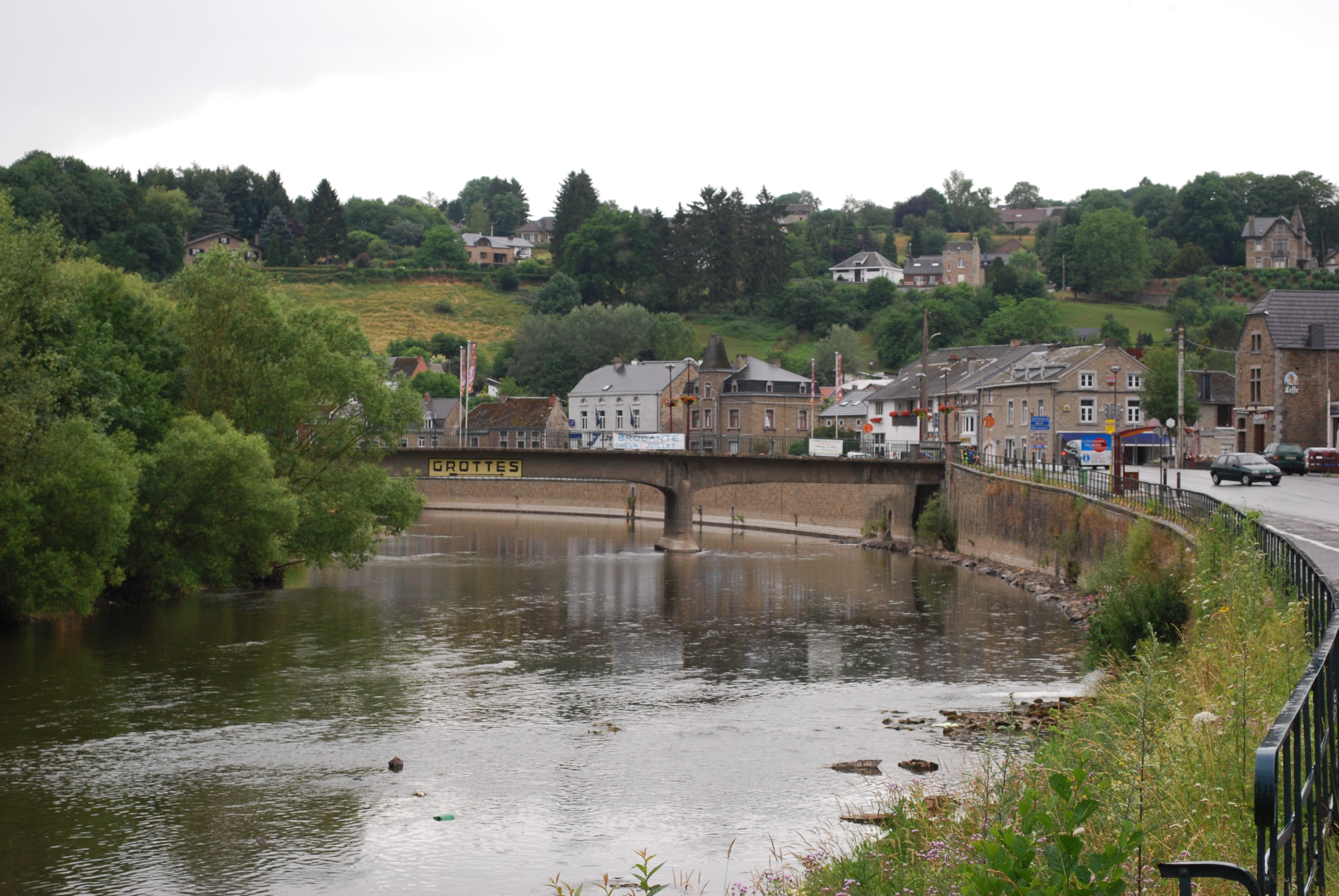
The Ourthe flowing through Comblain-au-Pont

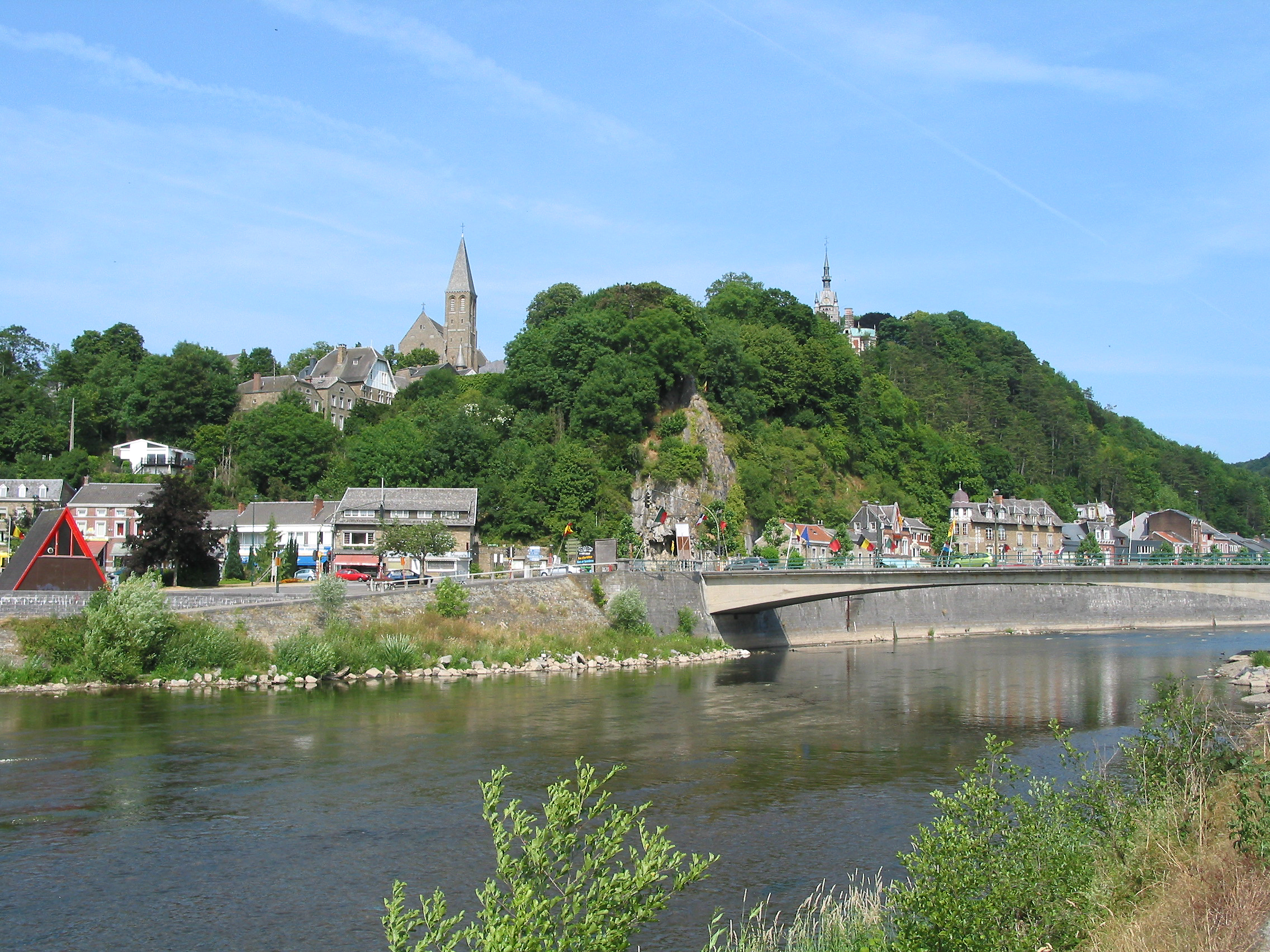
View at Esneux and its bridge across the river

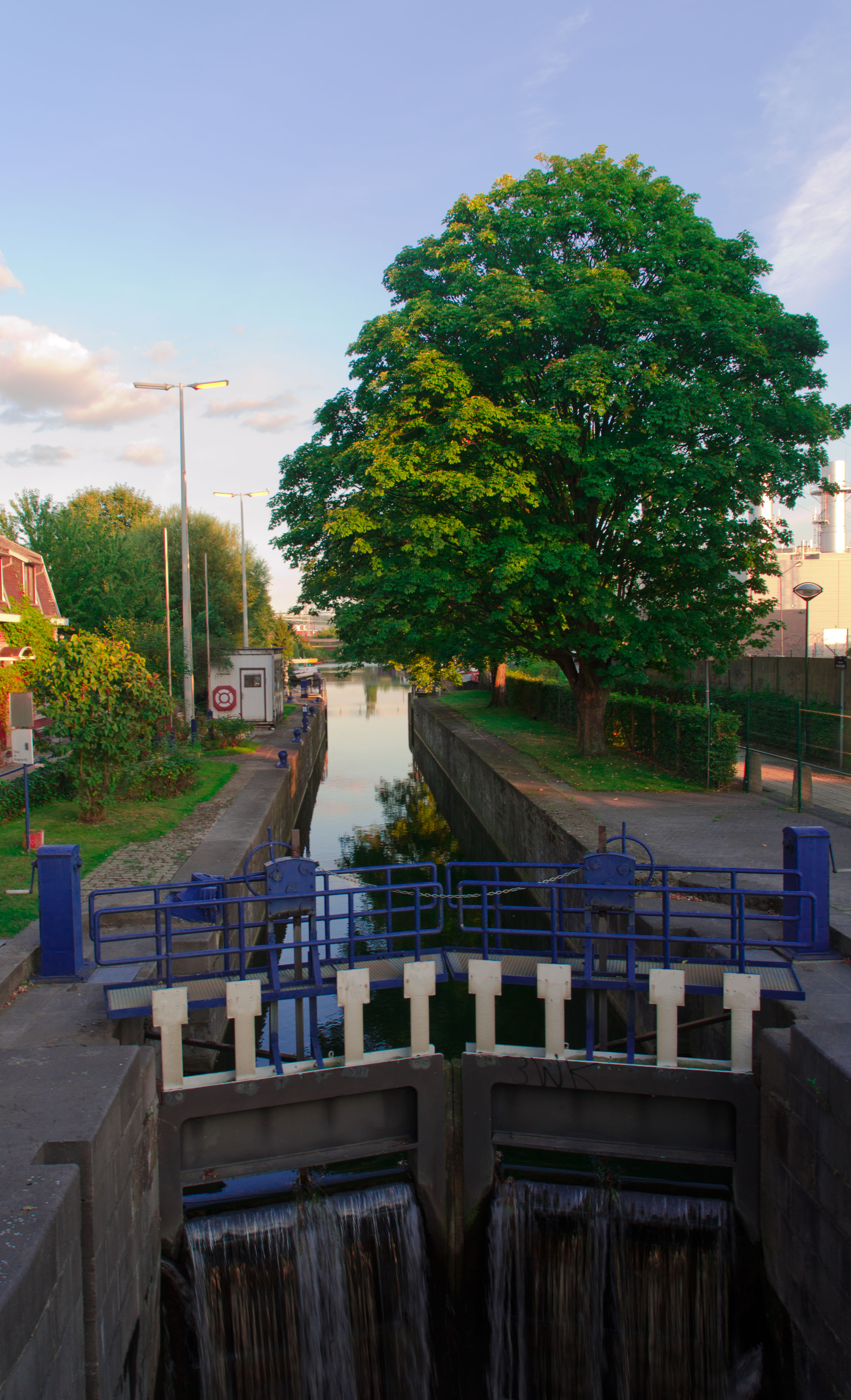
Lock on the Ourthe canal that runs parallel to the lower part of the river, Liège
