= List of anonymous masters =

In art history, an anonymous master is an Old Master whose work is known, but whose name is lost.

== Renaissance ==
Only in the Renaissance did individual artists in Western Europe acquire personalities known by their peers (some listed by Vasari in his Lives of the Artists), such as those known by:

- Their true name or their father's name:
  - Filippino Lippi after his father Fra Filippo Lippi
- A chosen pseudonym, possibly linked to his birthplace or his father's trade:
  - Giuliano da Sangallo worked on the gate of Saint Gall
  - Antonio del Pollaiuolo, after his father, a chicken farmer (pollo in Italian)
  - Jacopo del Sellaio, after his father, a saddler (sellier)
  - The Della Robbias (after the Tuscan word robbia, dyers' madder, and his father, the dyer Luca della Robbia)
  - Masuccio Segondo, student of Masuccio Primo
  - etc.
- A surname attributed to him:
  - Il Cronaca, who never stopped talking about the ruins he had seen in Rome
  - Daniele da Volterra, nicknamed Il Braghettone (the breeches maker) for having censored nudes in paintings by adding cloths or branches, at the request of Pope Paul IV
  - Luca della Robbia, for the madder colour he used as a ceramicist
  - Masaccio, known as the idiot
  - etc.
- A corporation, whose generic name is given to works made by all its members:
  - the Campionesi Masters, sculptors and builders of religious buildings (Ugo da Campione, Bonino da Campione, Giovanni da Campione, Zenone de Campione, Matteo da Campione)

== 20th-century problems of attribution ==
The idea of a named and recognised painter originated among art historians early in the 20th century, who were attributing works they recognised to known painters. They later went back on some of these attributions, renaming as anonymous the painters they had formerly named. One example is the case of Pier Francesco Fiorentino, to whom Bernard Berenson attributed a number of works which were later re-attributed to Pseudo Pier Francesco Fiorentino, a Florence copyist. Some painters have even been described as anonymous (even many times like Barthélemy Eyck) before later being recognised. They thus held several names historically (those who are noted on the page devoted to them), although doubts continue surrounding some, such as Giovanni Gaddi (after 1333 – 1383) maybe the Master of the Misericordia dell’Accademia.

== Artists ==
=== Antiquity ===
- List of Greek vase painters

=== Dates ===
- Master of 1302
- Master of 1310
- Master of 1328
- Master of 1342
- Master of 1499
- Master of 1518
- Master of the 1540s

=== A ===
- Master of the Aachen Altar (fl. 1495–1520 or 1480–1520; Cologne), late Gothic painter
- Master of Affligem (fl. c. 1470–1500; Brussels), painter of the South Netherlandish school
- Master of Alkmaar (fl. early-16th century; Alkmaar), painter
- Master of Ambrass (fl. late-14th century; Prague), draughtsman
- Master of Amiens (fl. 1518–1521; Amiens), painter
- Master of the Antiphonal Q of San Giorgio Maggiore (fl. 1440–1470; Northern Italy), manuscript illuminator
- Master of Antoine de Bourgogne (fl. 1460–1490; Bruges), Flemish manuscript illuminator
- Master of Arguis (fl. 1st half of the 15th century; Aragon), painter
- Master of Ávila (fl. mid-15th century; Ávila), painter, possibly García del Barco
- Master of the Altarpiece of the Ten Commandments (fl. early-15th century; Göttingen), painter
- Master of the Annunciation to the Shepherds (fl. 1620–1640; Naples), painter
- Master of Astorga (fl. 1500–1530; Astorga), painter
- Master of the Assisi Choirbooks (fl. late-13th century; Italy), manuscript illuminator

=== B ===
- Master of Badia a Isola
- Master of the Bamberg Altar
- Master of the Baroncelli Portraits
- Becerril Master
- Bedford Master
- Master of the Beffi Triptych
- Master of the Beighem Altarpiece
- Master of the Berswordt Altar
- Biberach Master
- Bigallo Master
- Master of the Blue Crucifixes
- Boucicaut Master
- Master of the Brunswick Diptych
- Brunswick Monogrammist
- Master of the Brussels Initials
- Master of the Burgundian Prelates
- Master of the Bützow Altarpiece
- Byzantine Master of the Crucifix of Pisa
- Byzantios

=== C ===
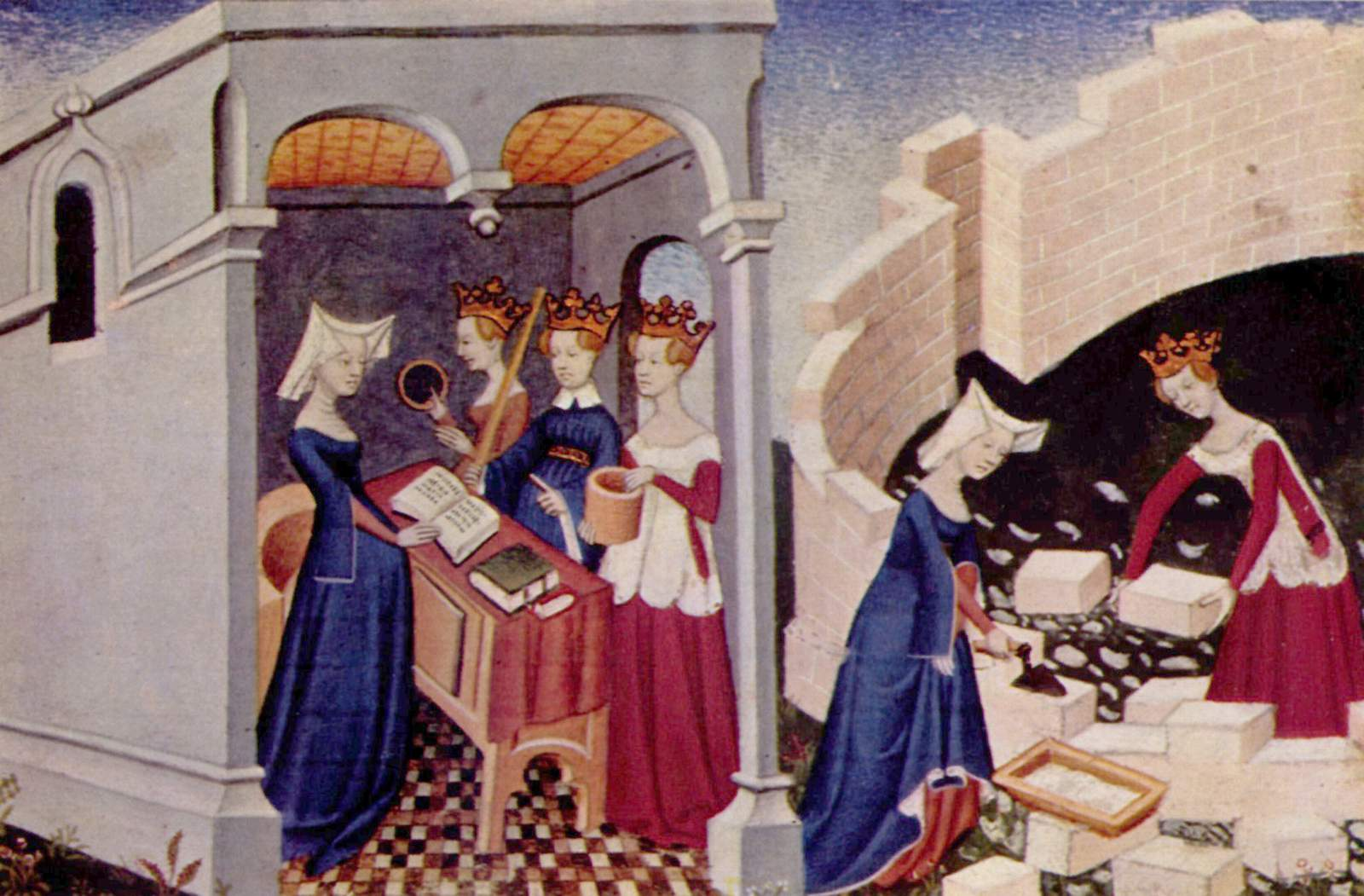
Master of the Cité des dames, illumination in The Book of the City of Ladies by Christine de Pizan.

- Master of Cabestany
- Calcarius (fl. 2nd quarter of the 13th century; Gotland), Romanesque sculptor
- Campionesi Masters
- Master of the Cappella di San Nicola, fresco painter in Assisi
- Master of the Cappella Medici Polyptych
- Master of Cardinal de Bourbon
- Master of the Cassone degli Adimari, probably Lo Scheggia, brother of Masaccio
- Master of the Cassoni Campana, builder of cassone
- Master of the Castello della Manta
- Master of the Castello Nativity
- Master of Castelsardo
- Master of Castelseprio, fresco painter at Santa Maria Foris Portas at Castelseprio, in the province of Varese
- Maître de Chaource
- Master of the Cité des dames
- Master of Città di Castello
- Master of the Codex of Saint George
- Master of Crea
- Master of the Cypresses

=== D ===
- Master of the Darmstädter Passion
- Master of the Darup Altarpiece
- Master of the Death of the Virgin (engraver)
- Master of the Death of the Virgin (painter)
- Master of Delft
- Master of the Deruta-Salerno Missals
- Master of the Die
- Masters of Dirc van Delf
- Master of the Drapery Studies (fl. c. 1450–1500), German Gothic painter and draughtsman, also known as Master of the Coburg Roundels
- Master of the Dresden Prayerbook
- Dunois Master (fl. c. 1430–1465; France); manuscript illuminator; also known as the Chief Associate of the Bedford Master

=== E ===
- Master of the Egmont Albums
- Elmelunde Master
- Master of the Embroidered Foliage
- Master of the Epître d'Othéa
- Master E. S.
- Expressionist Master of Santa Chiara

=== F ===
- Master of the Female Half-Lengths
- Master of the Fiesole Epiphany
- Master of the Figdor Deposition
- Master of the Flemish Boethius
- Master of the Franciscan Crucifixions (fl. 13th century)
- Master of Frankfurt
- Master of the Fresco of the Twelve Moons (fl. late 14th century; northern Italy), painter of a secular fresco at Trente, in a room of the Tower of Eagles of the Castello del Buonconsiglio
- Master of the Friedberg Altarpiece
- Master of the Fröndenberger Altarpiece
- Master of the Furies

=== G ===
- Master of the Gardens of Love
- Master of the Gerona Martyrology
- Master of Girart de Roussillon
- Master of the Golden Altar
- Masters of the Gold Scrolls
- Master of the Graudenz Altarpiece
- Master of the Greenville Tondo
- Master of the Grigg Crucifixion
- Master of the Gubbio Cross

=== H ===
- Master of the Hallein Altar
- Master of Heiligenkreuz
- Master of the Heisterbach Altarpiece
- Master of the High Altar of Szmrecsány
- Master of the Holy Blood
- Master of the Holy Kinship
- Master of the Houghton Miniatures
- Master of the Housebook

=== I ===
- Master I. A. M. of Zwolle
- Illustratore
- Master of the Imhoff Altar
- Isaac Master
- Master of the Iserlohn Altarpiece

=== J ===
- Master of James IV of Scotland
- Master of Jannecke Bollengier
- Master of Jánosrét
- Master of the Jardin de vertueuse consolation
- Master of Jean Rolin II
- Master of Sir John Fastolf
- Master of Jouvenel

=== K ===
- Kanbun Master
- Master of the Karlsruhe Passion
- Master of the Khanenko Adoration
- Kirchdorf Master

=== L ===
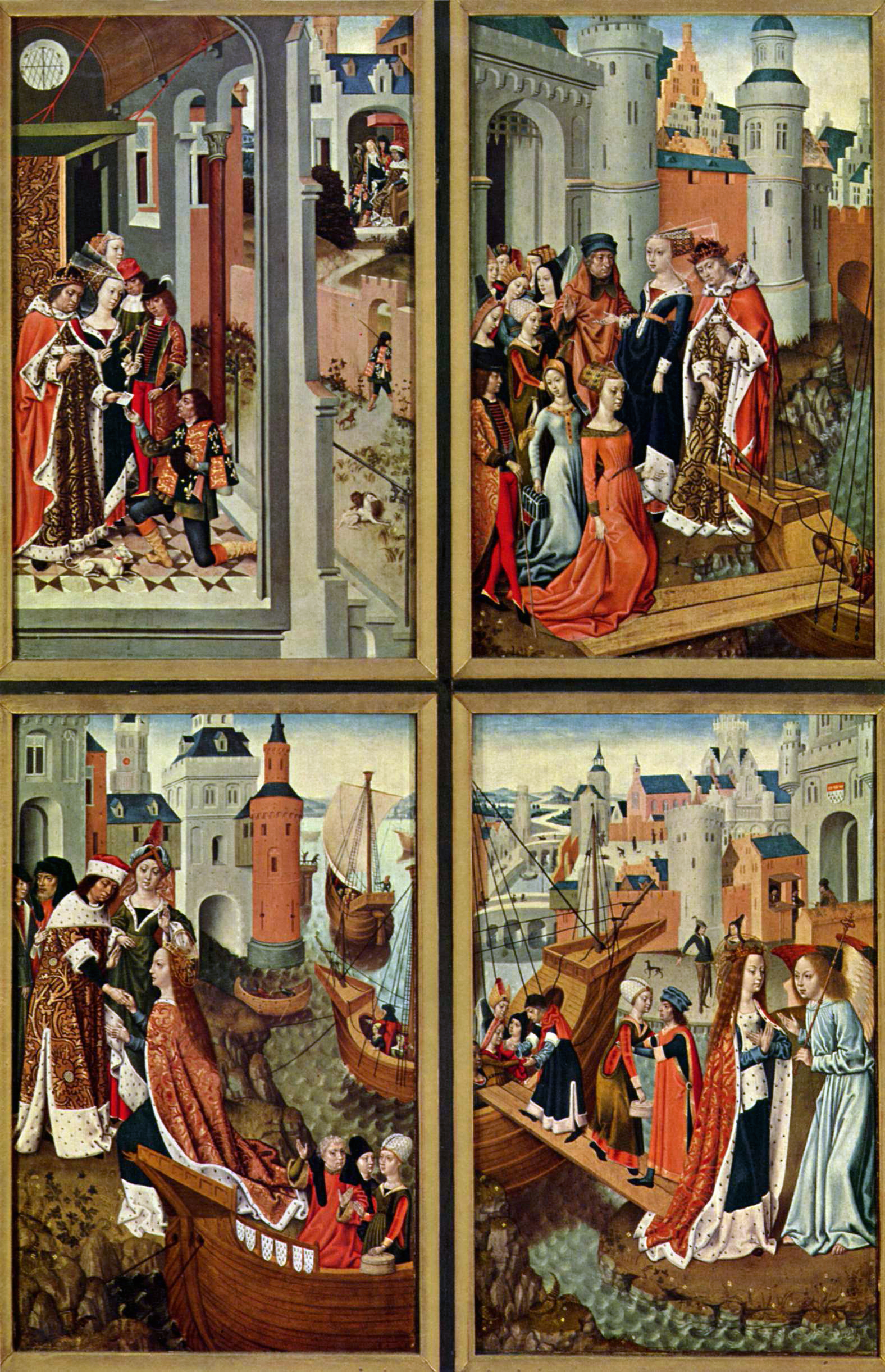
Master of the (Bruges) legend of St. Ursula (15th century)

- Master L. Cz.
- Master of the Legend of the Magdalen
- Master of the Legend of Saint Bruno
- Master of the legend of St. Ursula (Bruges) (fl. 1436–1505), Flemish painter
- Master of the Legend of Saint Ursula (Cologne) (fl. 1489–1515), German Renaissance painter
- Master of the Legend of Saint Lucy
- Master of the Legend of the Holy Mother
- Master of the Libro di casa
- Master of Liesborn
- Master of the Life of the Virgin
- Master of the Lille Adoration
- Master of the Lippborg Passion
- Master of the Litoměřice Altarpiece
- Master of the Llangattock Epiphany
- Master of the Llangattock Hours
- Master of Lourinhã
- Master of the Louvre Nativity, probably Fra Diamante (according to Bernard Berenson)
- Master of the Lübeck Bible
- Master of the Ludlow Annunciation

=== M ===
- Majestatis
- Master of the Malchin Altar
- Master of the Magdalen
- Master of Magione
- Master of the Marble Madonnas
- Master of Margaret of York
- Master of Mary of Burgundy
- Master of the Mesi
- Master of Meßkirch
- Master of the Mornauer Portrait
- Master MS
- Master of the Munich Golden Legend

=== N ===
- Naumburg Master (fl. mid-13th century; France and Germany), Gothic sculptor
- Master of the Nicolas Puchner Altarpiece
- Master of Nördlingen
- Northern Master

=== O ===
- Oltremontano Master
- Master of the Ortenberg Altarpiece
- Master of the Osservanza, Sienna school, 15th century
- Master of Otto van Moerdrecht (fl. c. 1420–30); Netherlandish illuminator
- Master of Ozieri

=== P ===
- Master of the Pähl Altarpiece
- Master of the Pallant Altarpiece
- Master of Panzano
- Master of the Parement
- Master with the Parrot
- Passion Master
- Master of Pedret
- Master of the Perkins Saint Paul
- Master of the Playing Cards
- Master of the Poldi-Pezzoli Diptychon
- Master of the Prayer Books of around 1500
- Master of the Predella

=== R ===
- Master of the Rajhrad Altarpiece
- Ravenelle Painter (fl. 1390–1405; France), manuscript illuminator, also known as the Master of the Book of Hours of Johannete Ravenelle and as the First Master of the Bible Historiale of Jean de Berry
- Master of the Re Alberto Altarpiece
- Master of the Rebel Angels, Maestro degli Angeli Ribelli of Siena; two paintings are in the musée du Louvre
- Master of the Registrum Gregorii
- Master of the Regular Canons' Altarpiece
- Master of Rieux
- Master of Robert Gaguin
- Master of the Rohan Hours

=== S ===
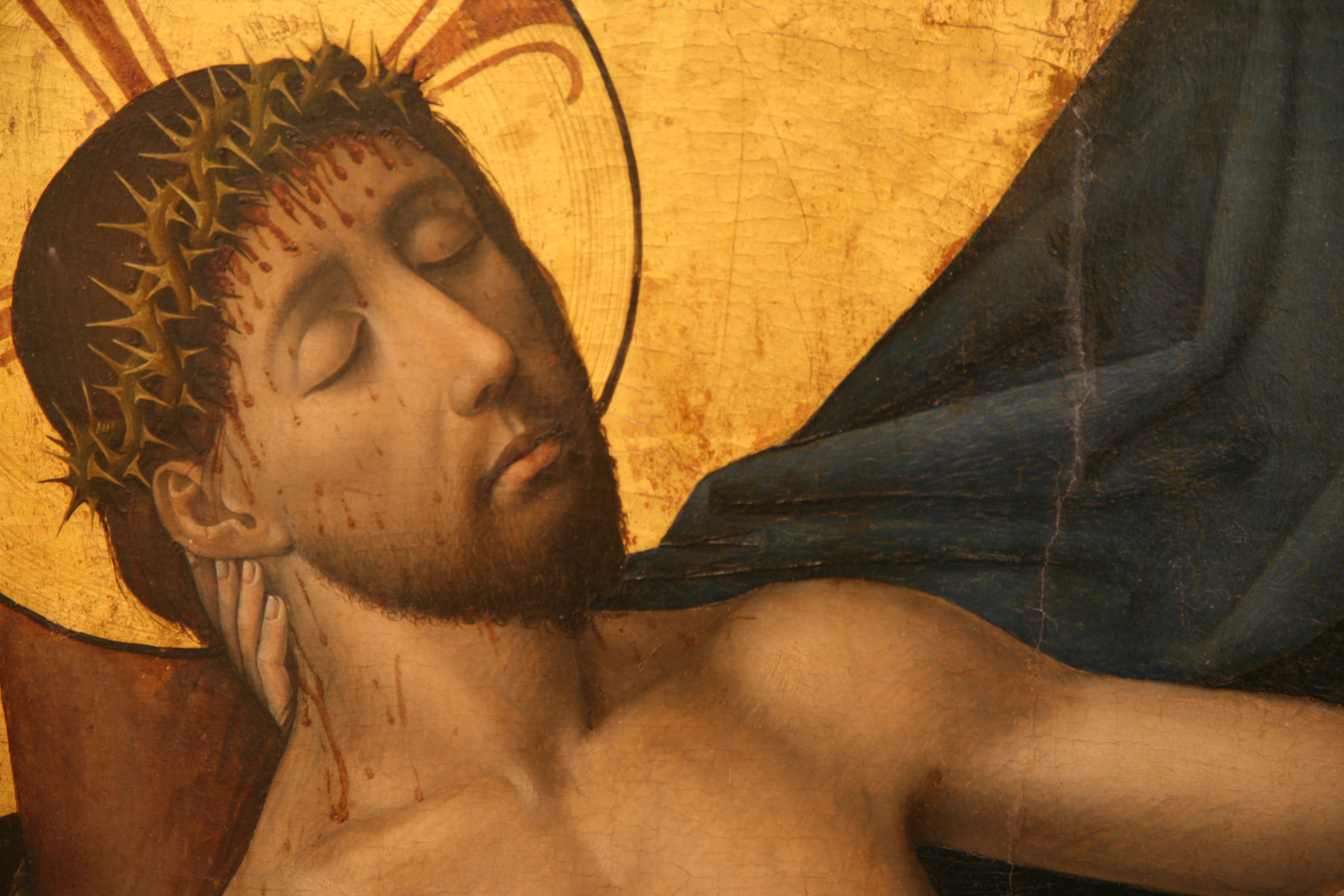
Master of the Stauffenberg Altarpiece: "The Descent from the Cross" (detail), Unterlinden Museum, Colmar

- Master of the Saint Augustine Altarpiece
- Master of the Saint Bartholomew Altarpiece
- Master of Saint Cecilia
- Master of Saint Francis
- Master of Saint Giles
- Master of the St. Louis Madonna
- Master of Saint Veronica (fl. c. 1400–1420)
- Master of Salzburg
- Master of the Saint Lambrecht Votive Altarpiece
- Master of the San Bartolomeo Altarpiece
- Master of San Francesco Bardi (fl. 1240–1270)
- Master of the San Giorgio Altarpiece
- Master of the San Lorenzo Choirbooks
- Master of San Martino alla Palma
- Master of San Severino
- Master of the Santa Barbara Altarpiece
- Master of San Torpè
- Master of Schloss Lichtenstein
- Master of the Schotten Altarpiece
- Master of the Schöppingen Altarpiece
- Master of Signa
- Master of the Small Landscapes
- Master of the Staufen Altarpiece
- Master of the Stauffenberg Altarpiece
- Master of the Sterbini Diptych
- Master of the Straus Madonna

=== T ===
- Master of Taüll
- Master of the Tavole Barberini
- Master of the Tennenbach Altar
- Master of the Terni Dormition
- Master of the Třeboň Altarpiece
- Master of Trognano
- Master of the Tucher Altarpiece

=== U ===
- Union Master
- Upper Rhenish Master, also known as Master of the Frankfurt Paradiesgärtlein

=== V ===
- Master of the Vienna Adoration
- Master of the Vienna Chroniques d'Angleterre
- Master of the View of Saint Gudula
- Master of Vignola
- Master of the Virgo inter Virgines
- Master of the Von Groote Adoration
- Master of Vyšší Brod (fl. c. 1350; Bohemia), Gothic painter, also known as the Master of Hohenfurth

=== W ===
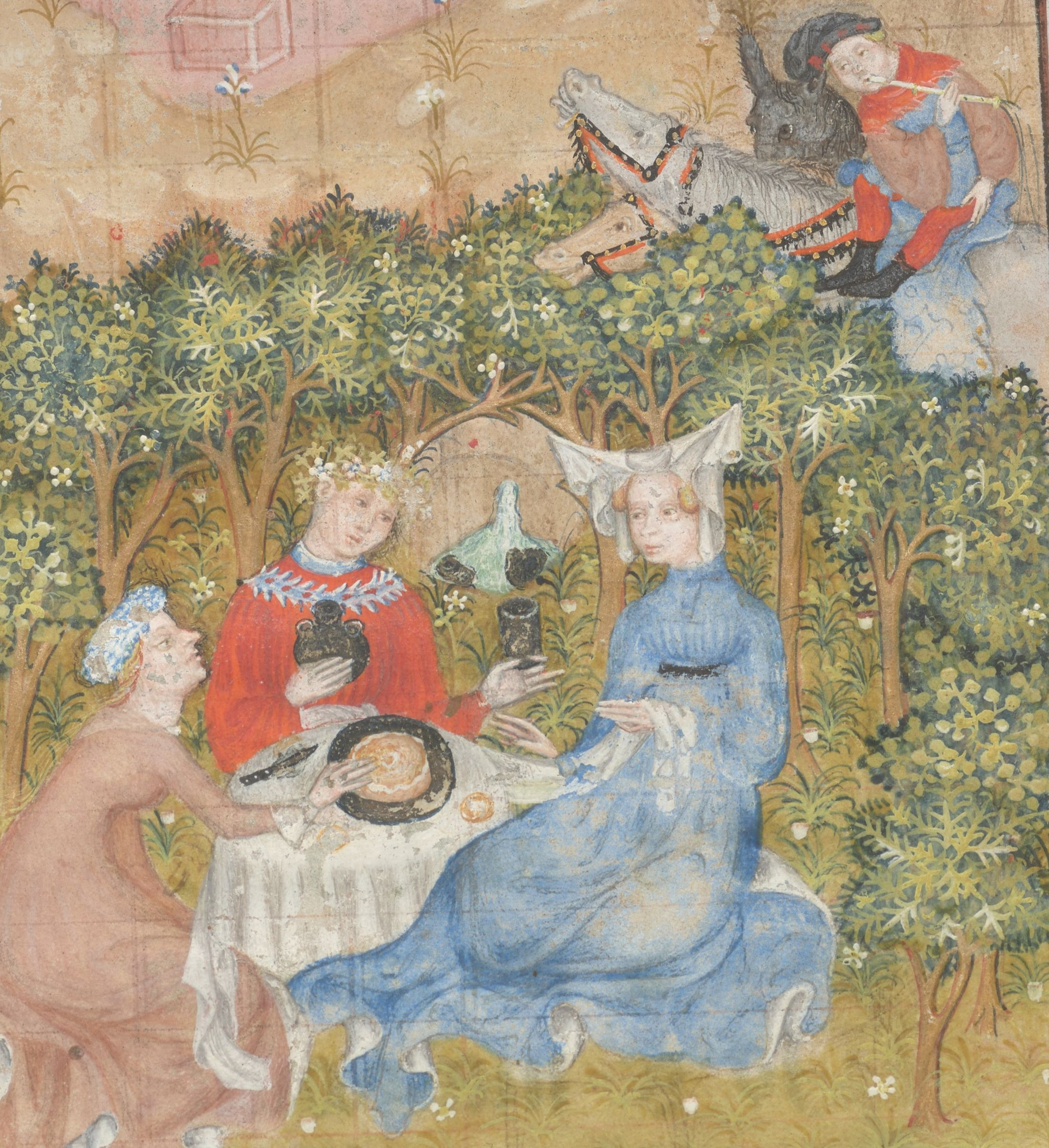
Detail from the Hamilton Field Book of Hours by the Master of Walters 219

- Master W. B.
- Master W with the Key
- Master of Walters 219
- Master of the Washington Coronation
- Master of the Wasservass Calvary
- Master of Wavrin
- Master of the Weibermacht

=== Z ===
- Master of Zweder van Culemborg

== Artists whose names have since been established ==
In recent years the names of a variety of artists who were formerly listed as "anonymous" have become known; accordingly scholarly writings and museum labels have been changed to reflect their new identities. Much the most famous of these is the Master of Flémalle (c 1378–1445), painter of the comté de Hainaut, who was established as Robert Campin. Other examples include:

- Jehan Bellegambe, sometimes called the "master of colours".
- Master of 1419 – recognised as Battista di Biagio Sanguigni, having painted and dated in 1419 the central panel for a triptych executed for Santa Maria a Latera, broken up and dispersed
- Master of the Chiostro degli Aranci – recognised as being Giovanni Consalvo, fresco painter at the monastery at Badia Fiorentina
- Barthélemy d'Eyck is the generally accepted as the painter known as the Master of the Aix Annunciation for paintings, and the Master of René of Anjou for illuminated manuscripts; he is also thought by many to be the Master of the Shadows
- The Dombild Master, as Stefan Lochner
- The Master of Moulins, identified as Jean Hey
- Master of the Gardner Annunciation, identified as Piermatteo Lauro de' Manfredi da Amelia through a contract discovered in Terni

== See also ==
- Anonymity
- Anonymous work
- Notname
- List of anonymously published works
- List of works published under a pseudonym

== Sources ==
- Daniel Arasse in the introduction to his Le Sujet dans le tableau. Champs Flammarion ISBN 2-08-121748-1 (1997) (2006)
