= Bartolomeo Passante =

Italian painter

- Born: 1618; Brindisi
- Died: 1648 (aged 29–30); Naples
- Occupation: Painter

Bartolomeo Passante or Bassante (1618 – 1648) was an Italian painter of the Baroque era active in Naples.

== Life ==
He was born in Brindisi. He reached Naples in 1629, where he probably studied under Jusepe de Ribera (according to Bernardo De Dominici), but according to other documents he frequently attended the studio of a certain Pietro Beato, marrying Beato's niece Angela Formichella in 1636. De Dominici saw his style as almost identical with that of Ribera, but modern critics find his style so different from Ribera's that it is thought to be close to that of Massimo Stanzione and Agostino Beltrano, whom he probably also studied under during his time with Beato. He died in Naples.

== Works ==
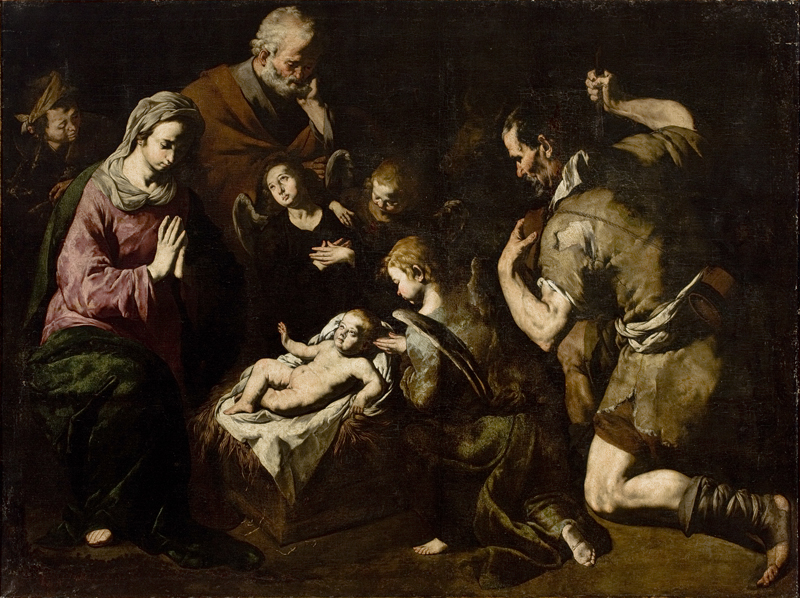
The Adoration of the Shepherds by Passante, São Paulo Museum of Art

There are two signed works by Passante: The Adoration of the Shepherds at The Prado and a Mystic Marriage of Saint Catherine in a private collection in Naples.

Saint Sebastian Tended by Pious Women (London), Holy Family with Saint Joseph Sleeping (private collection, Causa), a large Adoration of the Shepherds (in a Swedish church – perhaps the painting cited by De Dominici as being in the church of San Giacomo degli Spagnoli in Naples according to Giuliano Briganti), a Saint Catherine of Alexandria (Palazzo Madama, Turin) and a Triumph (private collection in Rome) are all also attributed to him for stylistic reasons. At the São Paulo Museum of Art there's another Adoration of the Shepherds attributed to him.

Spinosa argued that Passante is to be identified with the Master of the Annunciation to the Shepherds, who was active in Naples in the mid 17th century.

== Bibliography ==
- Bernardo De Dominici, Vite dei Pittori, Scultori, ed Architetti Napolitani (3 volumes), Stamperia del Ricciardi, Napoli 1742
- Raffaello Causa, La pittura del Seicento a Napoli dal naturalismo al barocco, in Storia di Napoli, Napoli 1972, pp. 974;
- Nicola Spinosa, Bartolomeo Bassante. Santa Caterina d'Alessandria, in Civiltà del Seicento a Napoli, exhibition catalogue, Napoli 1984, scheda n. 2.5, p. 189;
- Giuliano Briganti, Bartolomeo Bassante (?). Santa Caterina d'Alessandria, in G. Romano (ed.), Da Biduino ad Algardi. Pittura e scultura a confronto, Torino 1990, scheda n. 13, pp. 154–157;
- Ferdinando Bologna, Battistello Caracciolo e il primo naturalismo a Napoli, Napoli 1991, scheda n. 2.90, pp. 321–322;
- Francesco Abbate, Storia dell'arte nell'Italia meridionale, IV: Il secolo d'oro, Roma 2002, pp. 77–79.
- Giuseppe Porzio, La Scuola di Ribera : Giovanni Dò, Bartolomeo Passante, Enrico Fiammingo, Napoli, Arte'm, 2014.
