= Master of San Martino alla Palma =

Italian painter

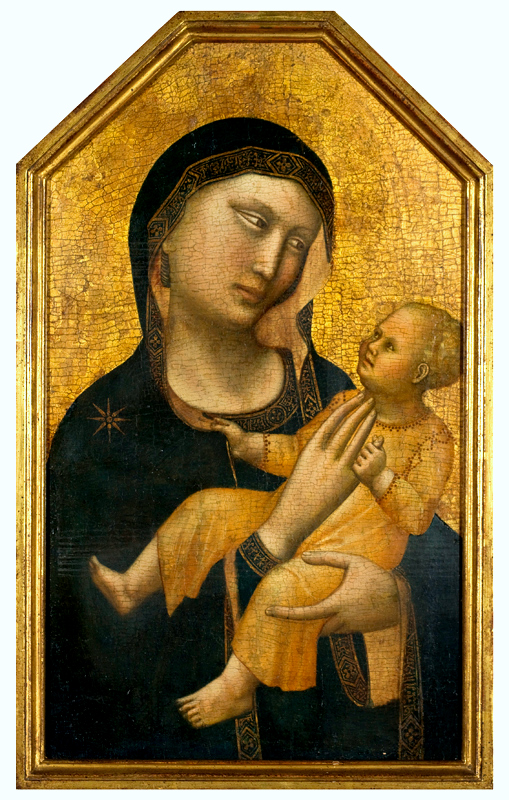
Madonna and Child (1310-1320). Painting by the Master of San Martino alla Palma (São Paulo Museum of Art, São Paulo)

The Master of San Martino alla Palma (formerly called the Amico di Daddi) was a Florentine painter active during the first third of the fourteenth century. An immediate follower of Bernardo Daddi, he is named for an altarpiece in the parish church of San Martino alla Palma located within the town limits of Scandicci, in the province of Florence. His chronology is uncertain; he has been linked with the Master of Saint Cecilia, the Master of the Saint George Codex, and Lippo di Benivieni, among others.
