= Master of the 1540s =

South Netherlandish painter

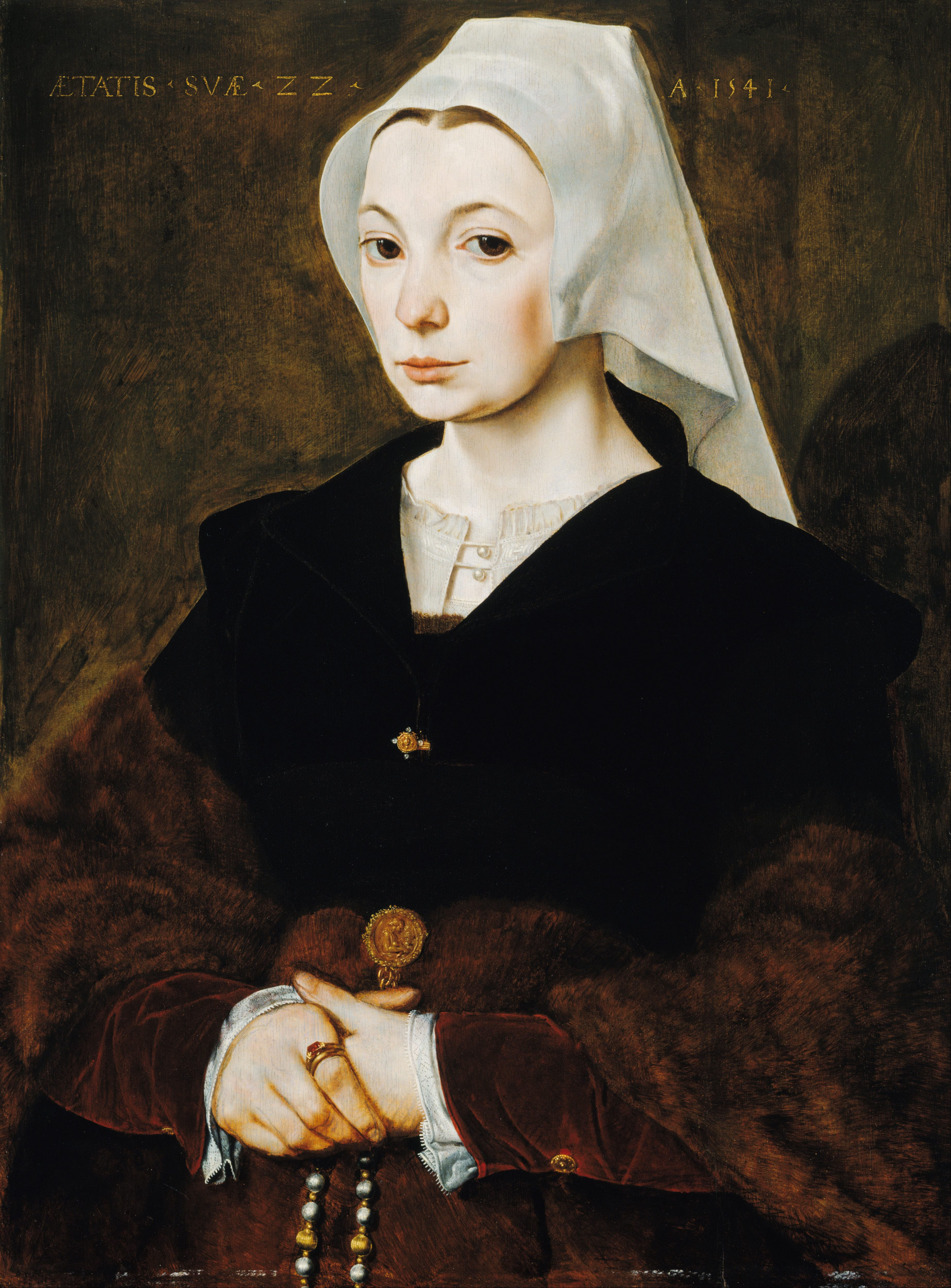
Portrait of a young woman by The Master of the 1540s, oil on oak panel, 1541, Art Gallery of New South Wales

The Master of the 1540s is a notname given to an unidentified artist who was active from 1541 to 1551. The identity of this artist was first brought up by Max Jakob Friedländer in 1936.

== History ==
The Master of the 1540s was a artist in the Netherlands that painted in a style similar to Joos van Cleve. Peter van den Brink theorised that this artist worked in van Cleve's studio and might have moved to England or Scotland after 1545. Gilbert van Schoonbeke and his wife were among the subjects that this artist painted, but all of the other subjects of the artist are unknown. Max Jakob Friedländer believed that this painter was active in Antwerp due to van Schoonbeke being a patron of an Antwerp hospital.

Some of the artist's work was previously attributed to Jan van Scorel. One of the artist's paintings came into the possession of Charles I of England. Portrait of a Young Man was sold at auction in Paris for FRF 360,000 on 30 May 1949.

== Attribution ==
Friedländer attributed at least 30 paintings to one unknown artist. He dubbed the artist behind these paintings the Master of the 1540s in the 13th volume of Early Netherlandish Painting in 1936.

Van den Brink determined that 16 of the paintings Friedländer attributed to the Master of the 1540s were indeed painted by the same person, but the remainder were painted by other people. However, Van den Brink discovered 7 paintings not included in Friedländer's list which were painted by the Master of the 1540s. Van den Brink's list of 23 paintings, 21 of which could be dated, includes six from 1541, two from 1542, four from 1532, five from 1544, and one each in 1545, 1547, 1550, and 1551. The majority of the artist's work was created between 1541 and 1545.

== See also ==
- Early Netherlandish painting

== Works cited ==
=== Books ===
- Beresford, Richard (2003). The James Fairfax Collection of Old Master Paintings, Drawings and Prints. Art Gallery of New South Wales. ISBN 0734763417.
- Friedländer, Max (1975). Early Netherlandish Painting. Vol. 9. Wolters Kluwer. ISBN 9028605959.
- Hand, John; Wolff, Martha (1986). Early Netherlandish Painting. Cambridge University Press.
- Benezit Dictionary of Artists. Vol. 9. Éditions Gründ. 2006. ISBN 2700030796.

=== Web ===
- "Portrait of a Man". Harvard Art Museums. Archived from the original on 29 October 2025.
- "Portrait of a Woman Aged 59". National Gallery of Ireland. Archived from the original on 9 December 2019.
- Van den Brink, Peter (13 October 2022). "Whereabouts of Paintings by the Master of the 1540s Sought". Codarts. Archived from the original on 29 October 2025.
