= Master of the Cappella Medici Polyptych =

Italian painter

The Master of the Cappella Medici Polyptych (sometimes called the Master of Terenzano) was an Italian painter active between about 1315 and 1335.

Identified in the twentieth century by Bernard Berenson as the Master of Terenzano, the Master was renamed for a polyptych from his hand, dating to the 1320s, that originally stood in the Medici Chapel of the church of Santa Croce in Florence. The panels, half-length depictions of saints, have since been separated, and are used as pinnacles for the altarpiece on the high altar of the same church.

It would appear that the Master was well respected, even if he occupied a modest position in local artistic circles. He forms part of a line of artists, beginning with the Master of Saint Cecilia and continuing through Pacino de Bonaguida, whose work bears the influence of Giotto even as it stands in contrast. Similar painters, who have been described as being of the "miniaturist tendency", were best known for their work on illuminated manuscripts; nevertheless, the Master of the Cappella Medici Poliptych is known only through a dozen panel paintings. Among these is a large Crucifix in Stuttgart, as well as smaller works, such as a Virgin and Child Enthroned with Four Saints (once part of a portable altarpiece, now separated and found in Detroit).

Based upon the limited evidence of these works, the Master likely trained in Pacino's workshop at some point during the second decade of the fourteenth century. His figures are generally timid-looking and doll-like, and reveal a kinship with the younger and more prolific Master of the Dominican Effigies; so similar are their works that the two were initially confused, and it is still believed that they may have worked together. A debt to Giotto may be seen in some works; from the 1320s on his style betrays knowledge of the work of Jacopo del Casentino and Bernardo Daddi. Unlike the latter, however, he had little success in adapting his training in smaller genres to the large-scale style of Giotto.
