= Crucifix of Pisa =

Painting by Byzantine Master of the Crucifix of Pisa

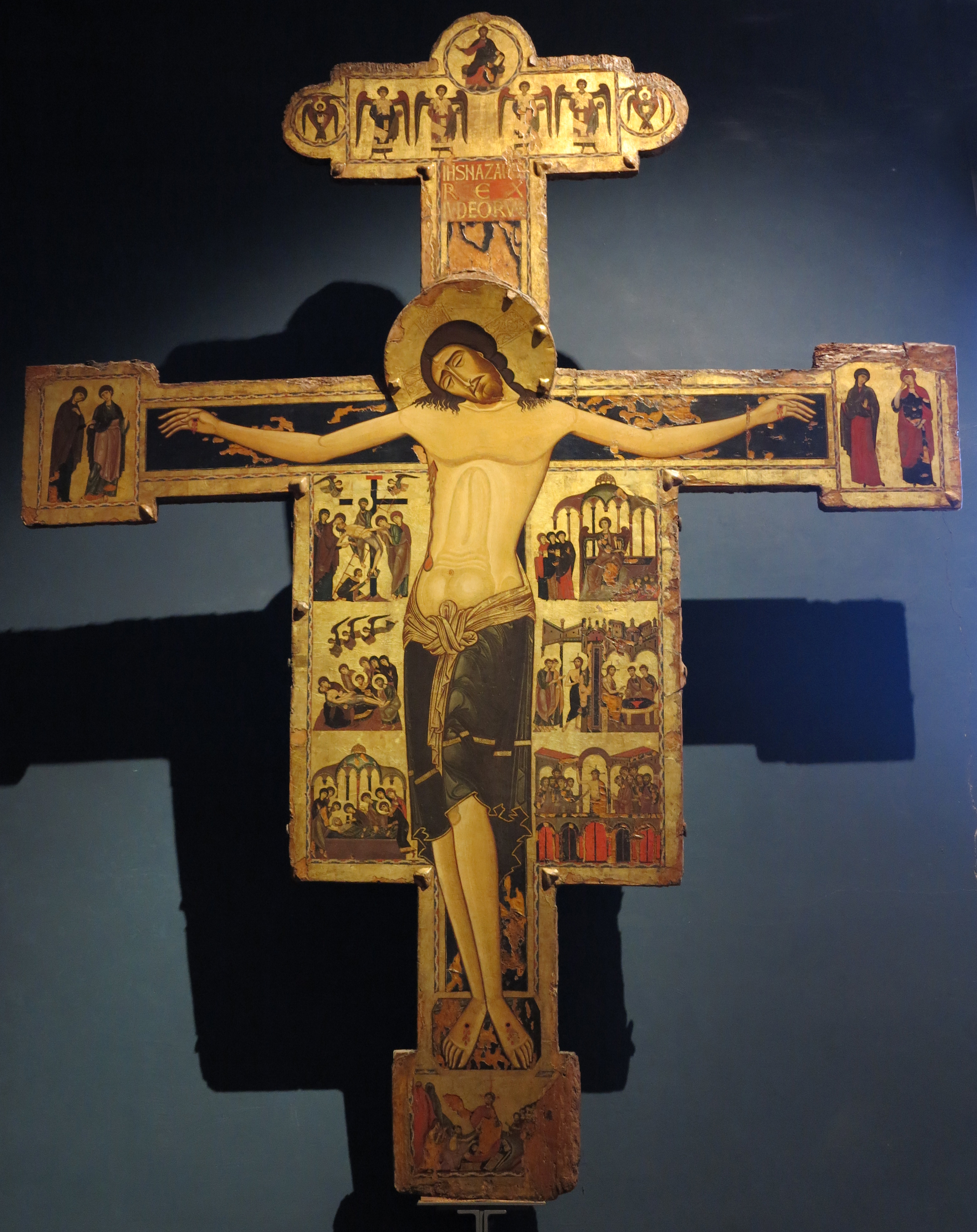
Byzantine Crucifix of Pisa

The Crucifix of Pisa is an Italo-Byzantine painting of the crucifixion painted on wood panel, dating to sometime around 1230 and now in the Museo nazionale di San Matteo, Pisa, Italy. Its anonymous author is referred to as the Byzantine Master of the Crucifix of Pisa. He was an Italian painter active in Pisa in the first half of the thirteenth century. The painting is significant in the history of Italian painting for its iconography of the patient, suffering Christ on the cross; although then new, it quickly replaced the older style, depicting Christ triumphant and free from pain, with open eyes and a regal bearing free from sorrow.

The painting contains all the canonical elements of this type of representation, already known from Byzantine art and miniature painting. Christ's head falls to the left; the eyes are closed, and a small trail of blood escapes from one wound. The four arms of the cross are decorated with smaller scenes, as is traditional:

- a painting of Christ in triumph with angels at the head
- depictions of spectators at the arms
- the suppedaneo at the feet

Flanking the body of Christ are gold ground representations of various scenes from the Passion. The body itself is rigid, with little suggestion of movement or life; this is in contrast to the slightly later depictions of the same scene by Giunta Pisano and Cimabue, both of which show the body bending under its own weight.
