= Master of Jannecke Bollengier =

Flemish painter

The Master of Jannecke Bollengier was a Flemish painter of illuminated manuscripts active in the area around Ghent, or possibly Bruges, around 1500.

His name is derived from an Hours made for the grand-daughter of Jacques le Boulengier, equerry to Charles the Bold.

The painter is known for the Arenberg Hours, from Flanders, Bruges, around 1500. It contains 16 full-page miniatures in full borders and 24 decorated calendar pages depicting seasonal day-to-day life. The book was housed in the library of the Dukes of Arenberg from the nineteenth to the mid-twentieth century. Scholars identify the Master of Jannecke Bollengier as the hand that created this book and as the painter who collaborated with the Master of the Dresden Prayer Book.

Note that other books by different artists of the same period are also sometimes known as Arenberg Hours, including the Hours of Catherine of Cleves, from about 1440, and one of the Hours produced by Willem Vrelant about 1460.

Comparable books in similar style exist in other library and museum collections; their association with the Master, however, remains unclear.
