= Master of 1302 =

Italian painter

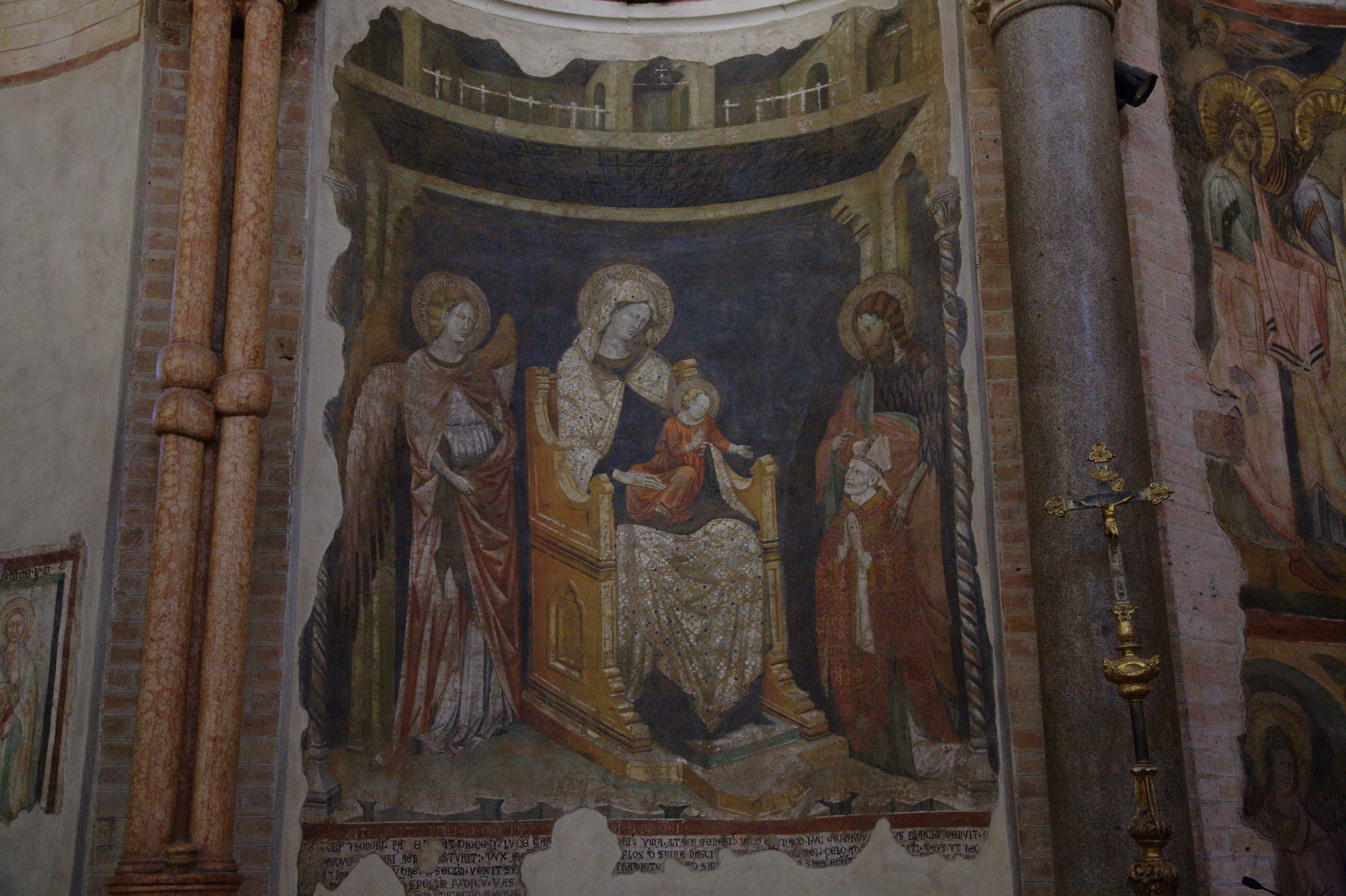
Battistero di Parma 20081206-89

The so-called Master of 1302 (Italian: Maestro del 1302), sometimes the Master of Gerardo Bianchi (Italian: Maestro di Gerardo Bianchi), was an Italian painter active in Emilia in the first half of the 14th century.

His works were Gothic in style, with modernized touches; his name comes from a set of votive frescos painted for bishop Gerardo Bianchi, who died in 1302. Among these is a Madonna and Child Enthroned with an Angel and John the Baptist, including a portrait of the donor, located in the Baptistry of Parma. Another pair of frescoes, in the third and fourteenth niches, appear to be by the same hand.

Other paintings associated with the Master show the influence of Lombard art, especially with a cycle in Como depicting the story of Saints Fausta and Liberata. A detached fresco, depicting the Madonna and Child and now found in the Pinacoteca in Cremona, has also been ascribed to him.
