= Master of the Gubbio Cross =

Italian painter

Crucifixion scene with Madonna and Saint John the Evangelist, oil on panel, gold ground (23.7 by 17.1 cm)

The Master of the Gubbio Cross was the name given to an Umbrian painter active between about 1285 and about 1320. He appears to have been familiar with the artists working at the Basilica of San Francesco d'Assisi, and some of his work bears a resemblance to that of Giunta Pisano.
