= Master of the Perkins Saint Paul =

Italian painter

The Master of the Perkins Saint Paul was an Italian artist active during the third quarter of the fourteenth century. His origins are uncertain; he is believed to have been Tuscan, and has tentatively been linked by some historians with the city of Lucca. He appears to have been familiar with the work of Antonio Veneziano. A number of his works, including that from which his name is derived, are held by the Treasury of the Basilica of San Francesco d'Assisi.
