= Master of the Death of the Virgin (engraver) =

The Master of the Death of the Virgin (fl. c. 1440–1450) was an engraver, probably active in what is now southern Germany. Approximately ten prints have been ascribed to him, including a Death of the Virgin for which he was named. He was formerly believed to be from the southern Netherlands, but is now thought to have lived in southern Germany. He was probably a goldsmith, and was among the first engravers known to be active. His style is awkward and unrefined, unlike the work of his contemporary, the Master of the Playing Cards. The drapery in his prints is stiff, and there is only a limited suggestion of space, creating an illusion that the figures are floating in mid-air. Most of the surviving work assigned to this Master is religious in nature; there is, however, a Battle Scene, a unique impression of which is housed in the Louvre in Paris. This depicts a broad landscape with at least eighty soldiers, both mounted and on foot, in heavy combat.
