= Master of 1342 =

French painter

The Master of 1342 was a Spanish painter active around Roussillon in France in the first half of the 14th century.

His name is derived from an altarpiece with Mary, the mother of Jesus, dated to 1342 and kept in the church of Serdinya. His style is heavily Gothic, with linear designs that appear to have been taken from miniature painting. A Crucifixion scene painted for a hermitage in Brescia is also believed to be his work.
