= Master of the Regular Canons' Altarpiece =

German painter

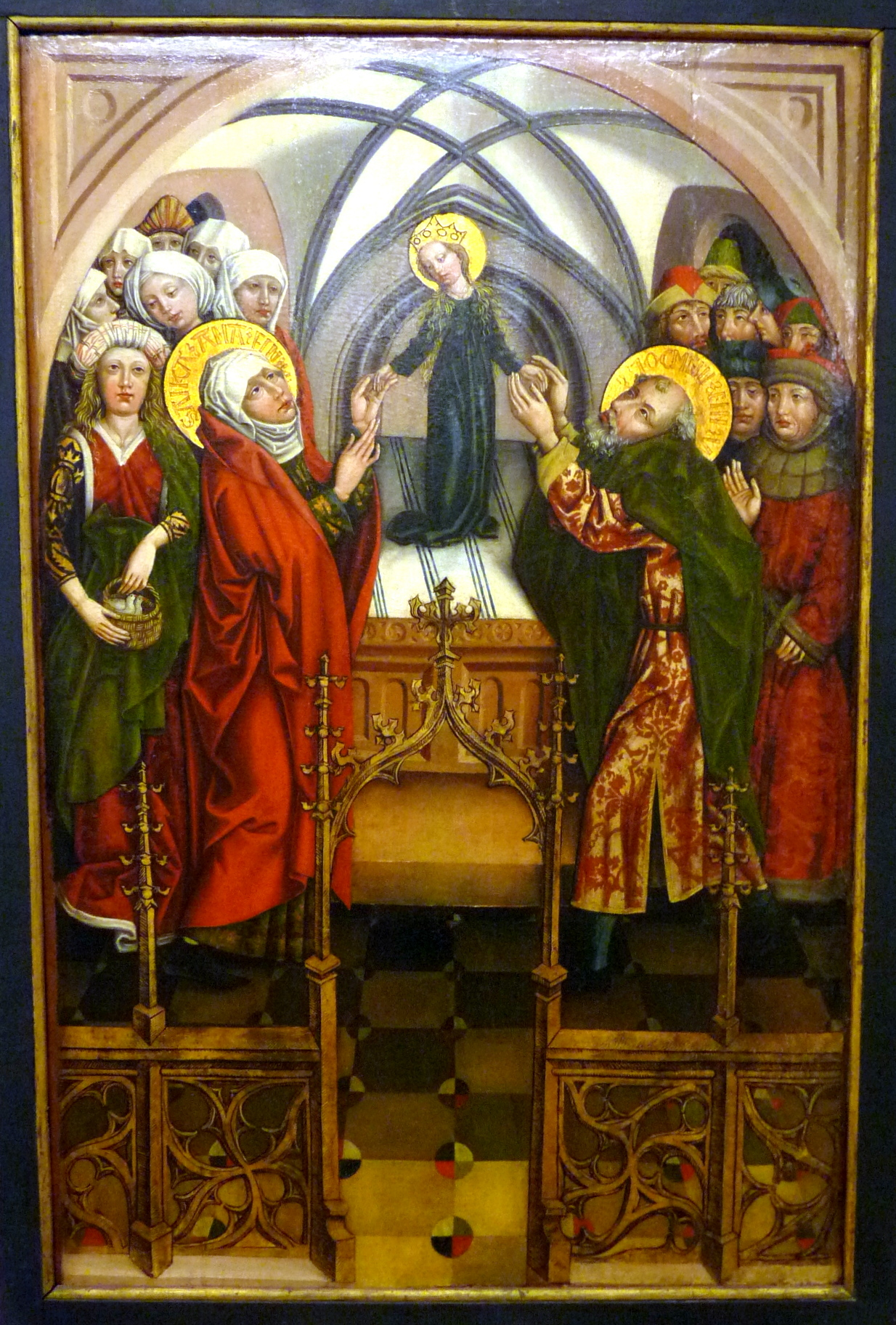
Franconian Gallery 53.JPG

The Master of the Regler Altar (German: Meister des Regler-Altars), also known as the Master of the Erfurt Regler Altarpiece, was a German painter active in the area around Erfurt during the fifteenth century.

He is named for an altarpiece painted for the church of the regular canons in Erfurt, dated to between 1450 and 1460; in addition one of his works is held by the Alte Pinakothek in Munich.
