= Master of the Antiphonal Q of San Giorgio Maggiore =

Italian painter

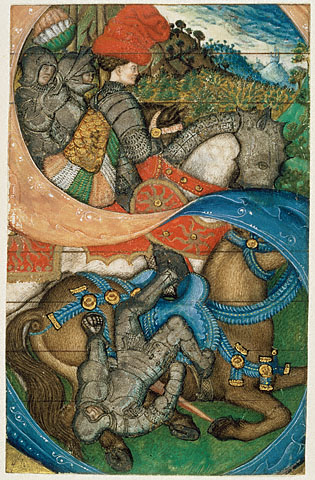
Detail of a miniature depiction of The Conversion of Saint Paul in the Getty Museum

The Master of the Antiphonal Q of San Giorgio Maggiore was an Italian painter of illuminated manuscripts active in the northern region of Italy, especially around Venice and possibly around Verona, between 1440 and 1470. His name is derived from a choir book decorated for the Benedictine monks of San Giorgio Maggiore in that city. Stylistically, he appears to have been aware of the work of Pisanello. His miniatures are highly naturalistic, although bound by formal and decorative restraints.
