= Master of the Figdor Deposition =

Early Netherlandish painter

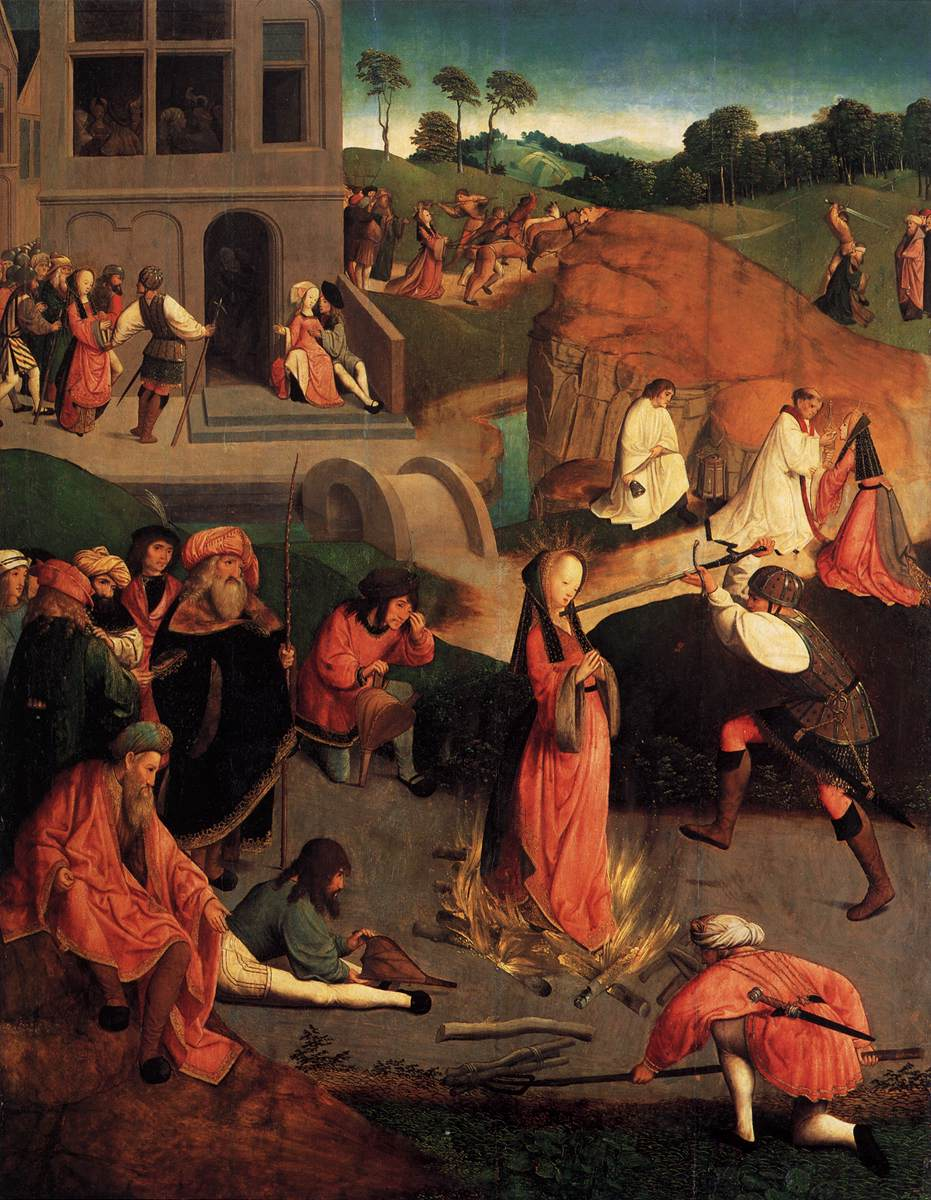
The Martyrdom of St Lucy, formerly part of a wing of an altarpiece, which was separated from its counterpart, the so-called Figdor Deposition. The church from whence these paintings came, as well as the whereabouts of the other wing of the altarpiece, are unknown.

Master of the Figdor Deposition (1480–1500), was an Early Netherlandish painter.

== Biography ==
He was named by Max J. Friedlander after the Austrian banker and art collector Albert Figdor for an altarpiece painting he owned and which was displayed in the Gemäldegalerie, Berlin, but which was destroyed in 1945 during World War II. This artist is sometimes also called the Master of the Martyrdom of St. Lucy after the backside of the destroyed altarpiece, which is in the collection of the Rijksmuseum Amsterdam. On stylistic grounds the painter has been called "Pseudo-Geertgen" or the pupil of Geertgen tot Sint Jans and was probably active in Haarlem.

For the similarity of the alternate name, this artist is sometimes confused with the Flemish Master of the Legend of Saint Lucy.
