= Lippo di Benivieni =

Italian painter

Lippo di Benivieni (active 1296–1327) was a Florentine painter active during the first third of the fourteenth century. Little is known of his biography.
