= Master of the Graudenz Altarpiece =

Grudziądz Altarpiece
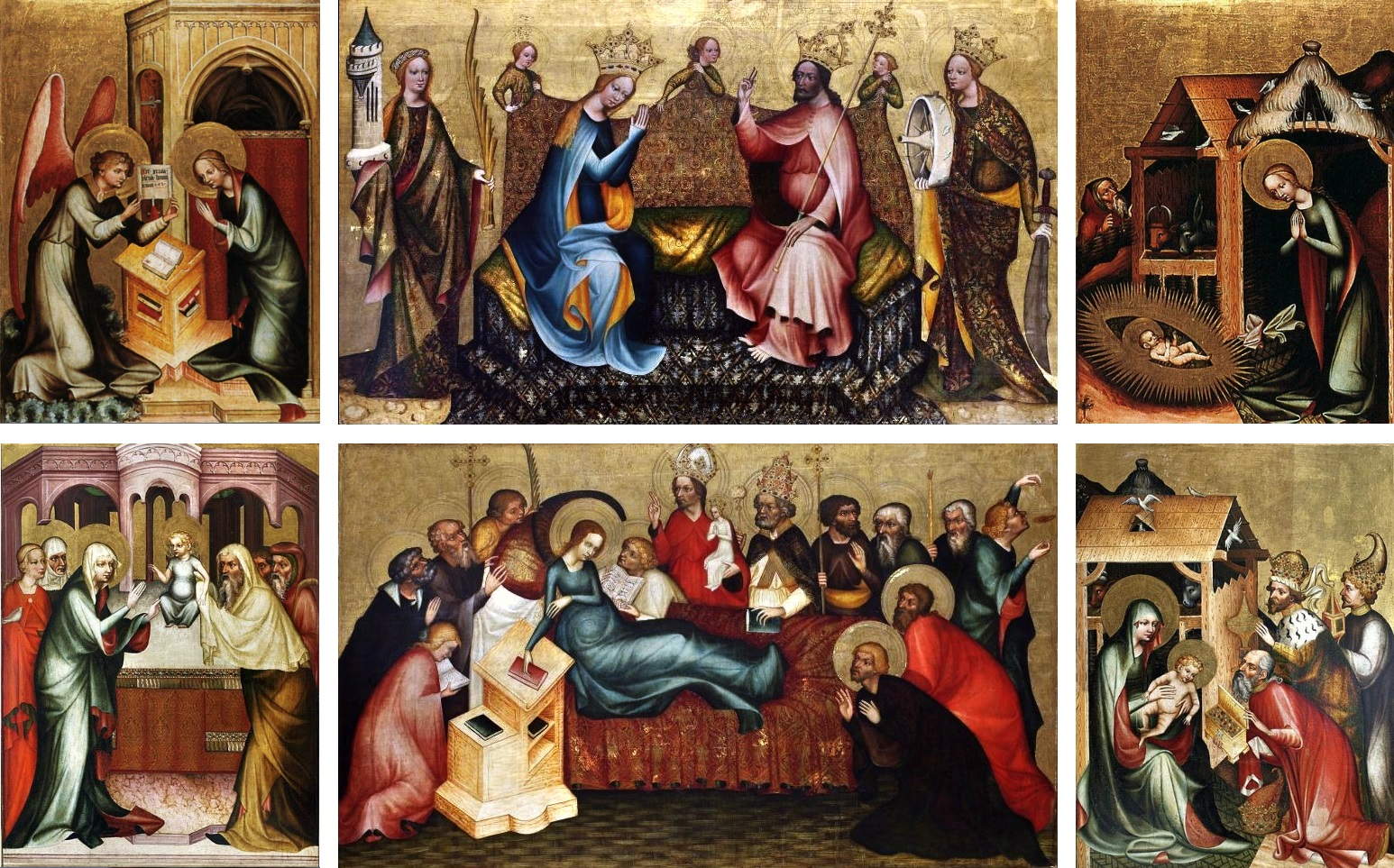

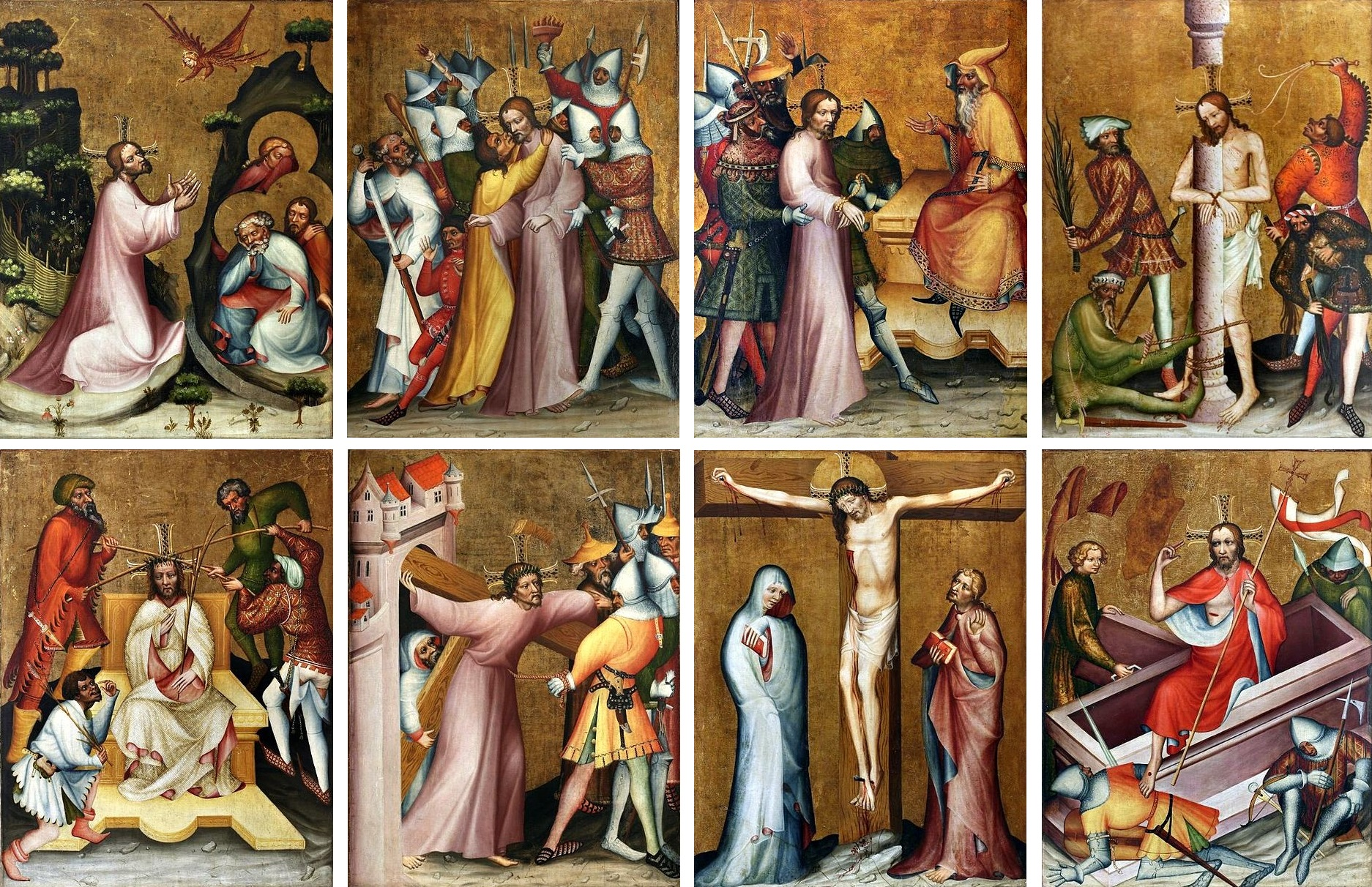
Grudziądz Polyptych (opened and closed)

The Master of the Grudziądz Altarpiece was a Bohemian artist, active at the end of the 14th and the beginning of the 15th century. His name is derived from an altarpiece which hung in the castle of the Teutonic Knights in Grudziądz (German: Graudenz), and may now be seen in National Museum in Warsaw. Closed, the altarpiece depicts the Noli me tangere and the resurrection of the dead on two registers to the left; on the right, Christ in Majesty and the Virgin and John the Apostle. The wings show eight scenes from the Passion, while inside are scenes from the Life of the Virgin. At the center is an image of the Death and Coronation of the Virgin.

It seems probable that the Master worked on the altarpiece with the aid of another artist; he seems to have been responsible for the Coronation scenes himself, showing a debt to the Master of the Třeboň Altarpiece in the process. The Passion cycle is likely by the hand of a painter from Lower Saxony, from the circle of Master Bertram.
