= Master of the Saint Augustine Altarpiece =

German painter

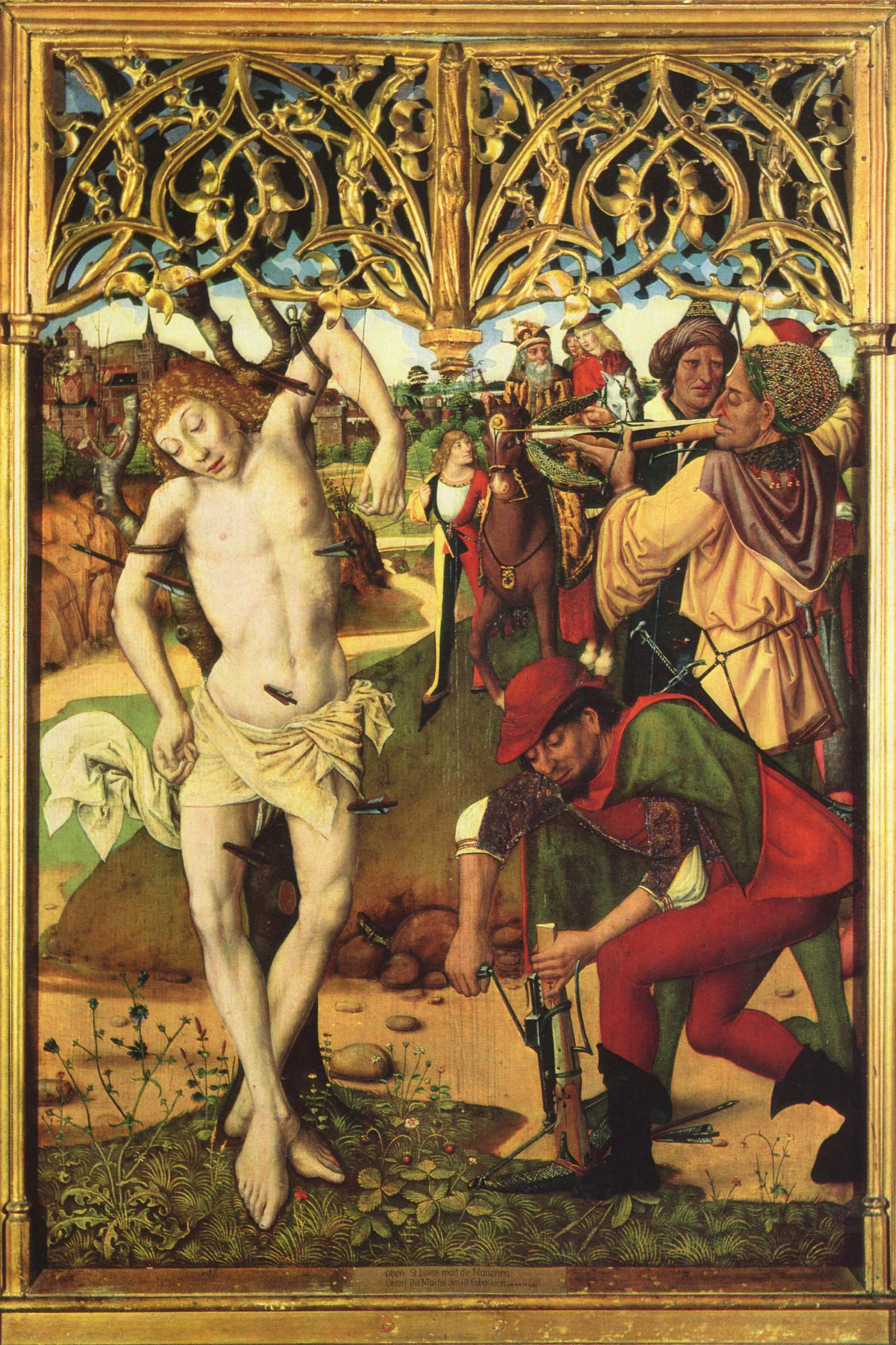
Master of the St. Vitus Altar 001.jpg

The Master of the Saint Augustine Altarpiece (sometimes called the Master of the Augustinians' Altarpiece; German: Meister des Augustiner-Altars) was a German painter active in Nuremberg during the second half of the 15th century. His work indicates familiarity with the work of both Martin Schöngauer and the Master of the Housebook. His notable works include Saint Luke Drawing the Virgin (1487).
