= Master of Ozieri =

Italian painter

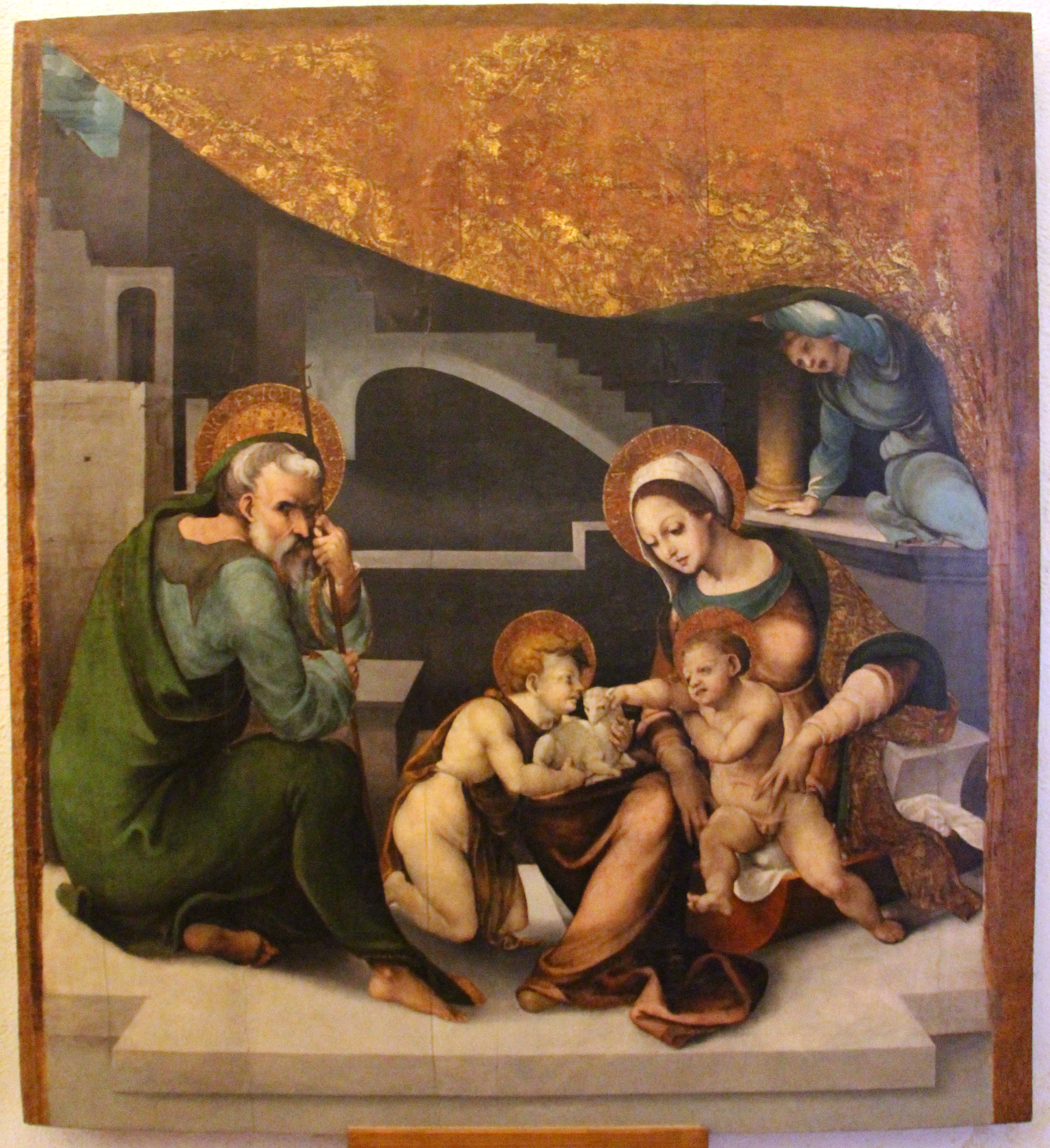
Holy Family, (16th century), Pinacoteca Giovanni Spano, Ploaghe

The Master of Ozieri (Italian: Maestro di Ozieri; fl. 16th century), identified by some scholars as Andrea Sanna, although his precise identity is not yet known, was an Italian painter from Sardinia and head teacher of a Mannerist movement born and developed in Logudoro during the first half of the sixteenth century, whose painting shows Spanish and Flemish influences. He was born and died in Ozieri in the sixteenth century.

He was the painter of the polyptych of the Madonna of Loreto preserved in the Cathedral of the Immaculate in Ozieri, organized in seven sections, and the pictorial cycle of the church of Sant'Elena in Benetutti.

== Bibliography ==
- Goddard King, Georgiana (1923). Sardinian Painting. The Painters of the Golden Backgrounds. Bryn Mawr, Pennsylvania.
- Arditio, Fabrizio (2011). DK Eyewitness Travel Guide: Sardinia. Londra: Dorling Kindersley Ltd.
- Maria Vittoria Spissu (2014). Il Maestro di Ozieri. Le inquietudini nordiche di un pittore nella Sardegna del Cinquecento. Roma: Editore Il Poligrafo.
- Guide d'Italia. Sardegna. Milano: Touring Club Italiano. 1984.
- Lisai, Gianmichele; Maccioni, Antonio (2017). Il giro della Sardegna in 501 luoghi. Newton Compton Editori.
