= Master of the Fiesole Epiphany =

Italian painter

- Born: c. 1400-1450
- Died: After 1496
- Years active: 1475-1496

Master of the Fiesole Epiphany (c. 1400-1450 – after 1496) was an Italian painter active from 1475 to 1496, probably from Florence.

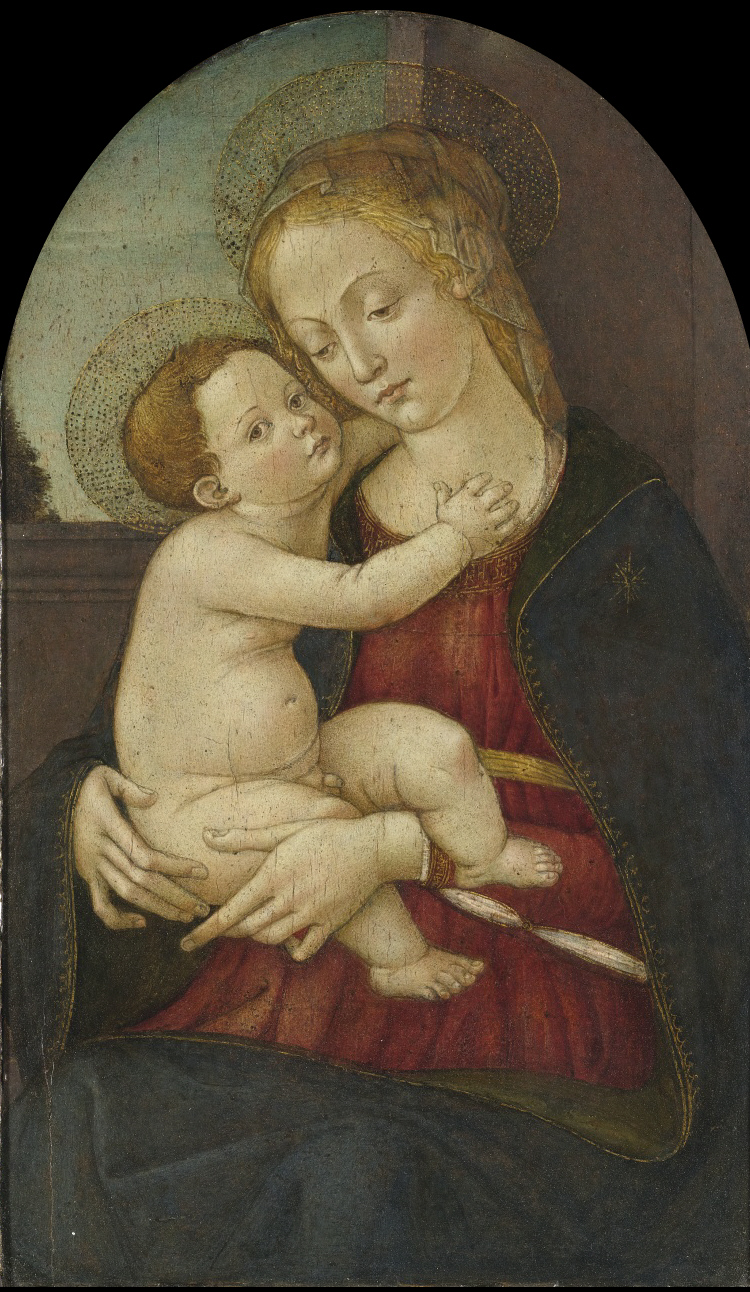
Madonna and Child before a Window

This Italian master was identified by the American art historian Everett Fahy who wrote about a work by him in The Burlington Magazine in 1967. The work discussed was a large panel representing the Epiphany of Christ located in the church of San Francesco in Fiesole, Italy. Fahy noted influences by Cosimo Rosselli and Jacopo del Sellaio, and postulated that this artist is possibly the same person as Filippo di Giuliano (1449-1503), an artist who shared a workshop with Jacopo in Florence after 1473.
