= Master of the Fröndenberger Altarpiece =

German painter

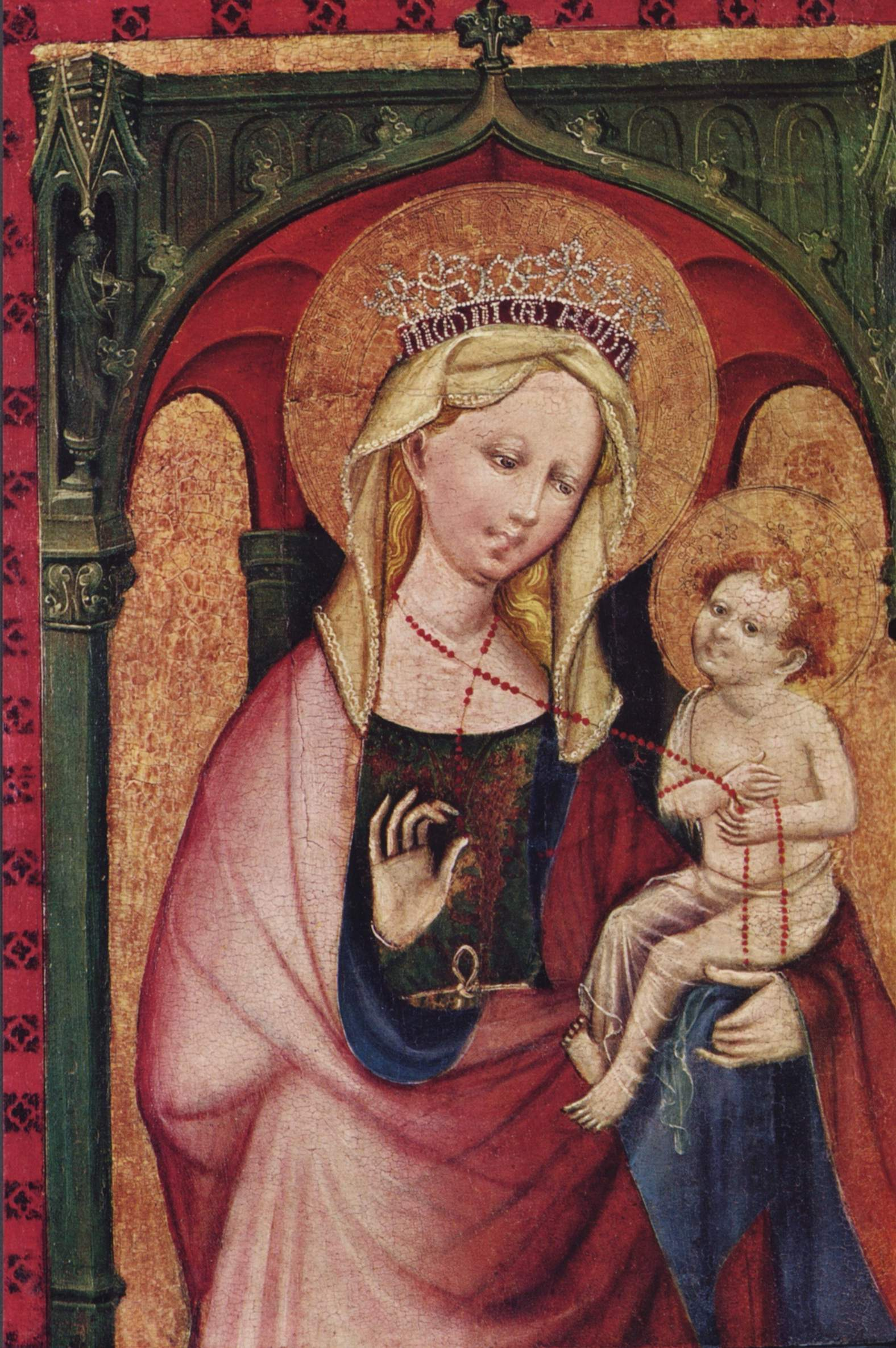

The Master of the Fröndenberger Altarpiece (German: Meister des Fröndenberger Altars) was a German painter active at the end of the fourteenth century and the beginning of the 15th whose name is not known. Between 1410 and 1420 he painted an altarpiece depicting the Virgin Mary for a monastery at Fröndenberg.

As of 1977, his work was part of the collection of the Westphalian State Museum of Art and Cultural History.
