= Masters of the Gold Scrolls =

15th-century illuminators

Masters of the Gold Scrolls was a group of fifteenth-century manuscript illuminators who worked from around 1410 to 1460 around Flanders, present-day Belgium. Their group name comes from their signature intertwining gold decorations found in the background of their miniatures. They often juxtaposed their golden scroll detailing against a neutral background to create a distinctive contrast. Their style was inspired by earlier artists such as the Beaufort Masters and was developed in an era before the work of Jan van Eyck.

Originally, art historians believed that there was only a singular Master of the Gold Scroll who created these works. Nowadays scholars attribute these works to a larger movement. This is because of the vast variations found across the illuminated manuscripts and the length of time within which these works were produced. These variations would make it difficult for one artisan to illustrate the amount of works within the estimated time frame. Within the group itself, art historians do not know the names of individual illuminators.

Art historians are not certain on the exact processes that the Masters of the Gold Scrolls used to illuminate their manuscripts. However, scholar Melanie Gifford theorized that the group "produced images in locations separate from the manuscript assembly" to save money and created templates, or stock images, to ease the mass production of their miniatures.

Art historians were able to properly ascribe thirteen of the Books of Hours to the gold scrolls group by recognizing notarized stamps that were added into the margins of manuscripts. From 1426, stamps were enforced on manuscripts throughout Flanders to recognize the work of official book illuminators considering the influx of copyists. Done in different colors, these stamps were official markings for identification by the Bruges government and were eventually connected to the work of the Masters of the Gold Scrolls.

The work of the Masters of the Gold Scrolls consists mostly of Books of Hours, but they also illuminated prayerbooks and missals. The movement responded to the rising popularity of these personal devotional books among Europeans during the fifteenth century. As literacy rates rose across Europe, the middle-classes wanted to own their own prayer books. These books were often produced in large quantities to adequately respond to the increasing demand. Books of Hours were even exported outside their sites of production and across Europe. Bruges was a major site of book production because of its proximity and connection to international markets.

== Stylistic features ==
Master of the Gold Scrolls – Leaf from a Book of Hours – Saint James the Greater – 2011.59 – Cleveland Museum of Art

The Masters of the Gold Scrolls style is generalized as the repeated twisting motif done in liquid gold and placed against a colored background that is either dark blue, red, or black. Every specific work varies slightly because more than one illuminator created these works under the Master of the Gold Scrolls group. Their style emerged in part because of the European schools of painting that encouraged this type of decoration and was popular in Flanders during the fifteenth century.

Within the miniatures illustrated by the Masters of the Gold scrolls, characters featured were often simplified in form and detail and placed in scenes that lacked accurate perspective. Art historian Georges Dogaer characterizes the human faces featured in the illuminations as having "flat noses" and "narrow lips". The characters are often repeated throughout their work.

Throughout their active years of production, the style used by the Masters of the Gold Scrolls fluctuated and evolved. Moving into the second quarter of the century, their style greatly developed as they experimented with an expansive color pallet and improved their depiction of natural subject matter.

== Subjects depicted ==
For subject matter, the Masters of the Gold Scrolls primarily produced religious imagery, but they also illuminated some secular manuscripts as well. The 1425 Book of Hours (Morgan Library, MS M. 76) includes many religious images, specifically on folio 195 that features an image of the patron praying to the Virgin Mary. The patron's inclusion within the miniature reveals how the manuscript was illuminated for a specific client in mind.

The Masters of the Gold Scrolls also illustrated bibles such as the 1432 Book of Genesis (London, British Library, Ms. 16). This bible features highly unique illustrations including the six days of Creation, a picture of the patron, intricate vine work, interwoven alongside Middle Dutch text.

The Harley MS 3838 manuscript (Morgan Library, Harley MS 3838) is a prayerbook that features many secular images. Dated to 1445, the manuscript features a classroom scene where a woman teaches a group of her students on folio 27 verso. On the following page, folio 28 recto, there is a children's alphabet that features the contrasting colors of red and blue to make it easier to make out each letter. These prayerbooks were specifically created for children to learn the alphabet and their first prayers.

== Books of Hours ==
Majority of the work created by the Masters of the Gold Scrolls were Books of Hours. These books were produced for a variety of wealthier clients. These books were structured into a series of prayers that were meant for personal worship and devotion by the patron. To meet the number of books requested by clients, the group repeated simple yet elegant patterns throughout their illuminations.

Early Books of Hours illuminated by the masters are decorated with floral motifs and gold accents, developing into their signature gold scrolls style. Their design was partly influenced by Italian illuminations but after 1440, the twisting gold inscriptions became less prominent until the motif disappeared entirely at the end of the century.

A 1440s Book of Hours (Morgan Library, MS M. 91) illustrates a religious scene, the crucifixion of Christ, which was part of the section Hours of the Cross. This scene is an example of the gold scrolls style. Within the miniature, the dark red backdrop to Christ is illuminated with the gold scroll detailing, creating woven designs and halo shapes emitting from the heads of Mary and John the Baptiste. Within the manuscript itself, the designs differ vastly from one another as multiple artists most likely collaborated on the project.

The Book of Hours of the Portuguese Infant Don Duarte, 1410 to 1420 (Lissabon, Instituto dos Arquivos, Torre do Tombo presents a highly unusual image for a miniature, a pregnant Virgin Mary who reads, (folio 140v). This book was dedicated to the young prince, Edward before his eventual reign as king from 1433. Art historians are not sure how the book was bestowed upon the future king.

The Book of Hours kept in the Walters Museum (Walters Ms. 239), created between 1420 and 1440, is an unusual example of the work belonging to the Masters of the Gold Scrolls. Throughout the manuscript, the images do not follow the stereotyped gold scroll styling featured in their other miniatures; instead, comprises abstract designs and uses a varied color pallet of light pink, blue, and green. Art historian Melanie Gifford theorizes that the designs on the miniatures and border took place in separate locations by separate illustrators by examining the difference between vine density on the pages. Within the manuscript, the figures drawn on the pages vary drastically throughout the book aiding to the belief that the miniatures were completed by separate illuminators.

The manuscript also features different stamps and markings. There is a repetition of the initials A and M, which alongside a coat of arms could be connected to the specific patron of the manuscript who held land in Amiens and Corbie. Additionally, many miniatures have a red stamp "Tau", a marker of the Masters of the Gold Scrolls drawn on the page, but scholars are unable to thoroughly explain its meaning.

There is much scholarly debate over whether the Masters of the Gold Scrolls illuminated the Walters 239 manuscript. Gifford believes that the stamps on miniatures within the manuscript resemble the trademark stamps of the group. However, art historian James Farquhar theorizes that the illuminator was not directly part of the group but rather took inspiration from the group's manuscript illumination and from styles practiced in the Netherlands and France at that time.

== Legacy ==
The recognizable style of the Masters of the Gold Scrolls was repeated by various manuscript illuminators long after the group disbanded and inspired Bruges manuscript illustrators such as Willem Vrelant.

== List of manuscripts ==
The following is a list of manuscripts.

- Book of Hours (Aberdeen, U.L., 25)
- Book of Hours (Arras, B.M., 536)
- Book of Hours (Aschaffenburg, Hofbibl. 7)
- Book of Hours (Baltimore, W.A.G., 169)
- Book of Hours (Baltimore, W.A.G., 170)
- Book of Hours (Baltimore, W.A.G., 172)
- Book of Hours (Baltimore, W.A.G., 173)
- Book of Hours (Baltimore, W.A.G., 211)
- Book of Hours (Baltimore, W.A.G., 239)
- Book of Hours (Baltimore, W.A.G., 246)
- Book of Hours (Baltimore, W.A.G., 270)
- Book of Hours (Baltimore, W.A.G., 238)
- Book of Hours (Bassano, Bibl. Del Museo Civico, Ms. N. 1564)
- Book of Hours (Berlin, Kunstbibl., Gris 4)
- Book of Hours (Besaçon, B.M., 50)
- Book of Hours (Bruges, Onze-Lieve-Vrouw ter Potterie, Ms. o.P. 51)
- Book of Hours (Brussels, B.R., 8645)
- Book of Hours (Brussels, B.R., 9785)
- Book of Hours (Brussels, B.R., 9798)
- Book of Hours (Brussels, B.R., IV 272)
- Book of Hours (Brussels, B.R., IV 288)
- Book of Hours (Brussels, B.R., IV 320)
- Book of Hours (Brussels, B.R., IV 518)
- Book of Hours (Cambridge, Clare College, Kk. 3.1)
- Book of Hours (Cambridge, Fitzwilliam Museum, 80)
- Book of Hours (Cambridge, Fitzwilliam Museum, 4-1954)
- Book of Hours (Cambridge, Fitzwilliam Museum, 1055–1975)
- Book of Hours (Cambridge, Trinity College, B.11.19)
- Book of Hours (Cambridge, Mass., Houghton L., Ms. Lat. 132)
- Book of Hours (Chicago, U.L., 344)
- Book of Hours (Courtray, Stadsbibl., 38)
- Book of Hours (Douai, B.M., 179)
- Book of Hours (Gotha, Forschungsbibl., 137)
- Book of Hours (The Hague, K.B., 76 F 25)
- Book of Hours (The Hague, K.B., 76 G 22)
- Book of Hours (The Hague, K.B., 130 E 17)
- Book of Hours (The Hague, K.B., 133 D 14)
- Book of Hours (The Hague, K.B., 133 D 15)
- Book of Hours (The Hague, Mus. Meerm.-Westr., 10 E 2)
- Book of Hours (The Hague, Mus. Meerm.-Westr., 10 F 11)
- Book of Hours (Karlsruhe, Landesbibl., Ms. St Georgen 28)
- Book of Hours (Liège, B.U., Wittert 17)
- Book of Hours (Lisbon, Arquivo Nacional, Armario do Tradados, Duarte Book of Hours)
- Book of Hours (Liverpool, U.L., F.2.19)
- Book of Hours (London, B.L., Arundel 341)
- Book of Hours (London, B.L., Harley 2846)
- Book of Hours (London, B.L., Harley 2884)
- Book of Hours (London, B.L., Yates Thompson 16)
- Book of Hours (London, V. & A. Museum, Reid 44)
- Book of Hours (London, V. & A. Museum, Reid (46)
- Book of Hours (London, V. & A. Museum, Reid (60)
- Book of Hours (London, V. & A. Museum, Reid (68)
- Book of Hours (Louvain, U.B., A-3)
- Book of Hours (Louvain, U.B., A-12)
- Book of Hours (Munich, Bayer, Staatsbibl., cod. germ. 83)
- Book of Hours (New York, P.M.L, M. 76)
- Book of Hours (New York, P.M.L, M. 347)
- Book of Hours (New York, P.M.L, M. 421)
- Book of Hours (Oxford, Bodl. L., Canon. Liturg. 17)
- Book of Hours (Oxford, Bodl. L., Canon. Liturg. 91)
- Book of Hours (Oxford, Bodl. L., Liturg. 400)
- Book of Hours (Oxford, Bodl. L., Rawl. Liturgy. e. 14)
- Book of Hours (Paris, B.N., lat. 3110)
- Book of Hours (Paris lat. 10538)
- Book of Hours (Paris B. St.-Geneviève, 1274)
- Book of Hours (Philadelphia, Free Library, Lewis 99)
- Book of Hours (Rennes, B.M., 31 (25))
- Book of Hours (Vatican, Ross. 63)
- Book of Hours (Vatican, Ross. 97)
- Book of Hours (Vatican, Ross. 100)
- Book of Hours (Venice Museo Correr, v, 16)
- Book of Hours (Venice Museo Correr, v, 149)
- Missal (Bruges, Groot Seminarie, 52/64)
- Missal (Bruges, Stadsbibl., 311)
- Missal (Bruges, Stadsbibl., 314)
- Missal (Brussels, B.R., 15074)
- Missal (New York, P.M.L., M. 374)
- Prayerbook (Brussels, B.R., 18270)
- Prayerbook (London, B.L., Add. 39638)
- Psalter (The Hague, K.B., 76 F 28)
