= Master of the Schotten Altarpiece =

German painter

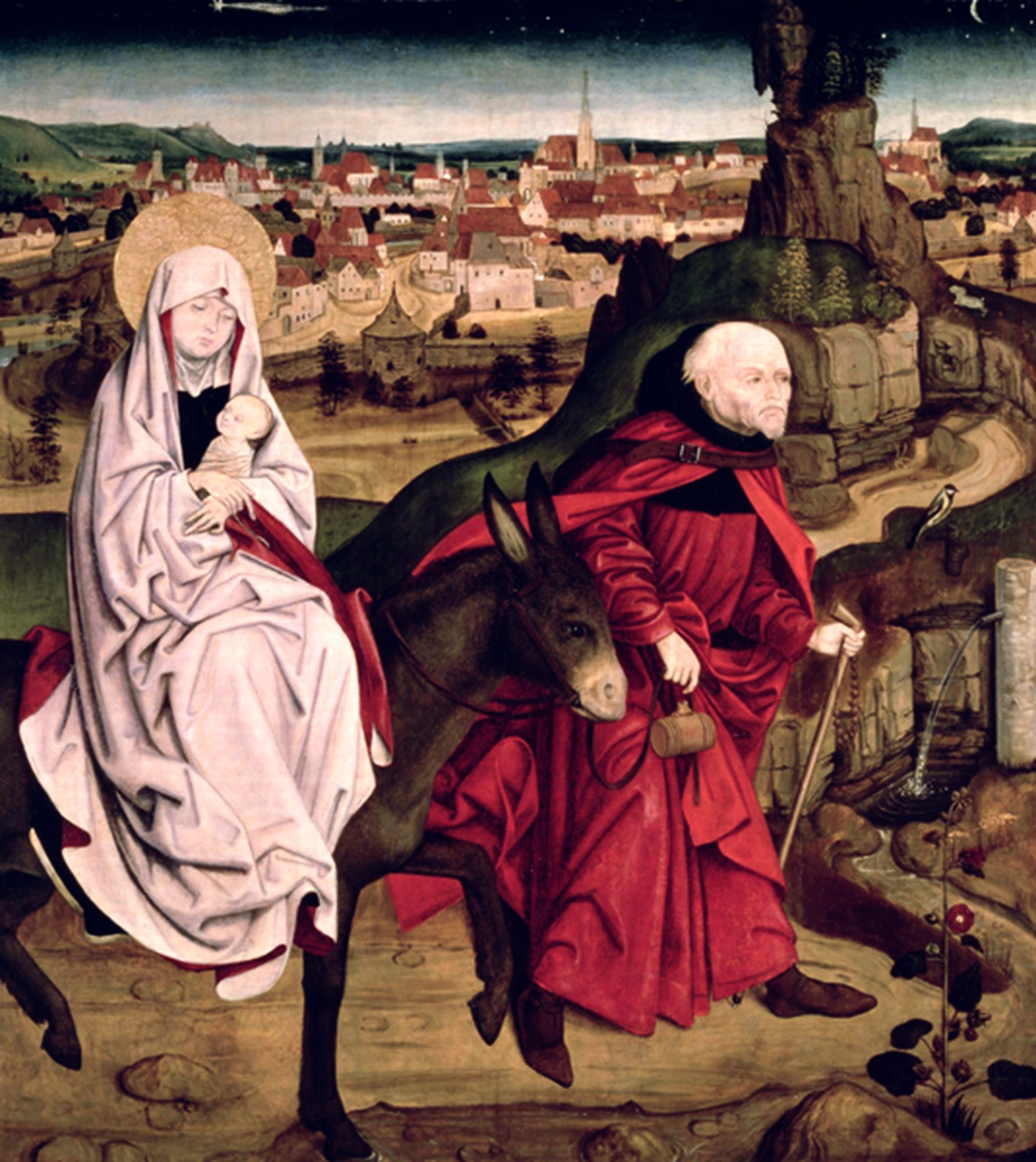
The Flight into Egypt, from the Schotten Altarpiece (c. 1390). Currently held by the Schottenkirche, Vienna

The Master of the Schotten Altarpiece (German: Meister des Wiener Schottenaltars) was a German painter, active in Vienna during the 14th and 15th centuries. His name is derived from an altarpiece dated to about 1390, which once stood in the church of St. Mary in Schotten. The altarpiece was dismantled in 1828.
