= Master of the Sterbini Diptych =

Italian painter

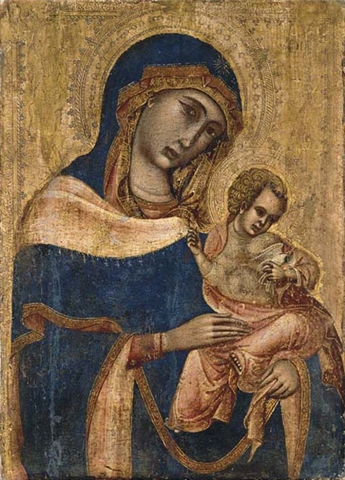
Madonna and Child (early 14th century), painting on gold ground panel, 47.3 x 34 cm

The Master of the Sterbini Diptych was an Italian painter active most likely in Venice during the early fourteenth century; other locations along the Adriatic coast have also been suggested. Several panels associated with this artist are believed to exist; his name is derived from a painting now in the Museo del Palazzo Venezia in Rome. Little is known about the artist, save that he works in the Italo-Byzantine style, influenced by the Cretan school or Greek traditions of icon-painting. Some historians believe that the artist may actually be a workshop group.
