= Master of the Straus Madonna =

Italian painter

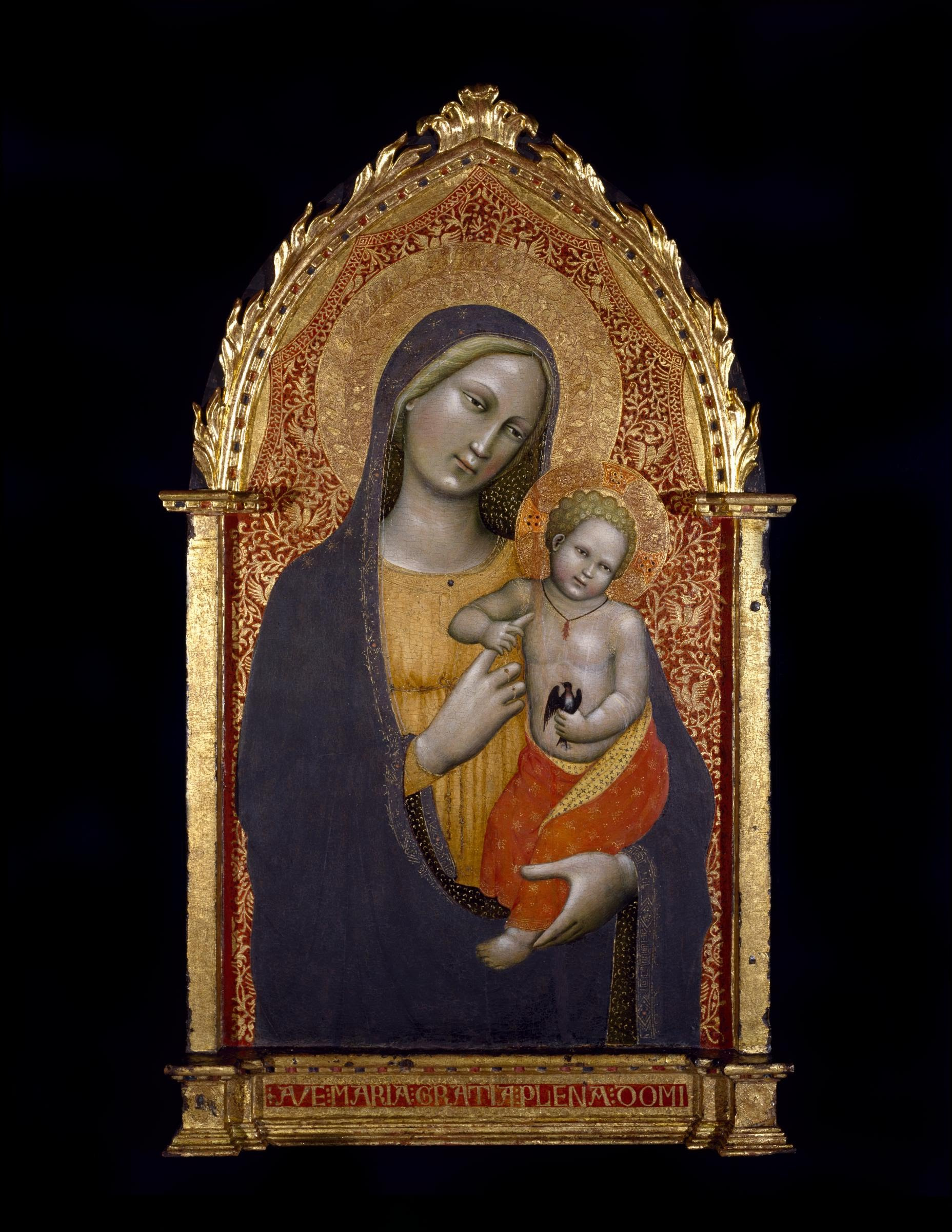
Virgin and Child in the MFAH for which the master is named

Master of the Straus Madonna (active c. 1385 – 1415), was an Italian painter.

== Biography ==
He was active in Florence and is named after a depiction of a Madonna and Child donated by the Straus family to the Museum of Fine Arts, Houston. He is possibly the same person as Cenni di Francesco di Ser Cenni. One of the most individual and lyrical Late Gothic Tuscan painters, he bridges the gap between Agnolo Gaddi and Lorenzo Monaco. His slender, pale figures blend spiritual evanescence with Giottesque solidity of form and are at their most expressive in the Man of Sorrows with Instruments of the Passion of c. 1395 and the Annunciation of c. 1405 (both Florence, Accademia), in which a highly refined sense of design balances perfectly with a poetic and vivid sense of colour. Striking touches of realism, as seen in the cockerel of the Passion or Gabriel's lilies, enliven these scenes. The subtly modelled Virgin and Child with Two Angels in the church at Sagginale (nr Borgo San Lorenzo), originally flanked by Sts John the Baptist and Dominic (both Oxford, Christ Church Picture Gallery), is one of the Master's finest mature works. Like Starnina and influenced in part by Spinello Aretino and the Giottesque revival, his graceful yet quietly compelling figures were important for the generation of Masolino in the last years of the Late Gothic style.
