= Master of the Annunciation to the Shepherds =

Italian painter

- Known for: Painting, particularly the Annunciation to the Shepherds
- Notable work: Annunciation to the Shepherds (Birmingham Museum and Art Gallery), Annunciation to the Shepherds (Museo di Capodimonte)
- Movement: Baroque (Neapolitan School)

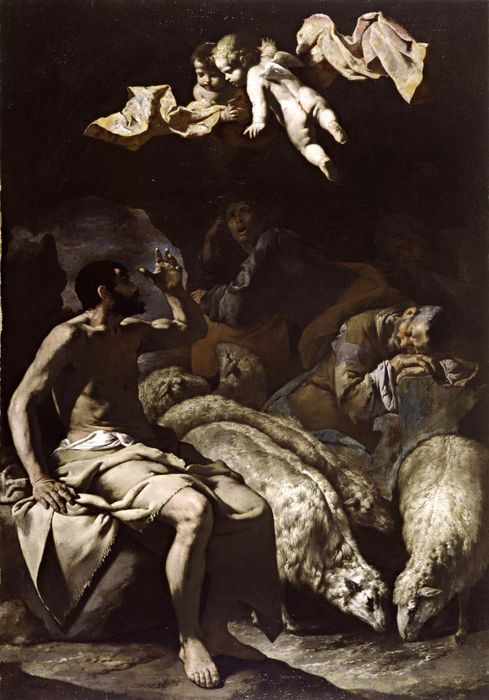
Annunciation to the Shepherds, c.1630, Birmingham Museums and Art Gallery, Birmingham.

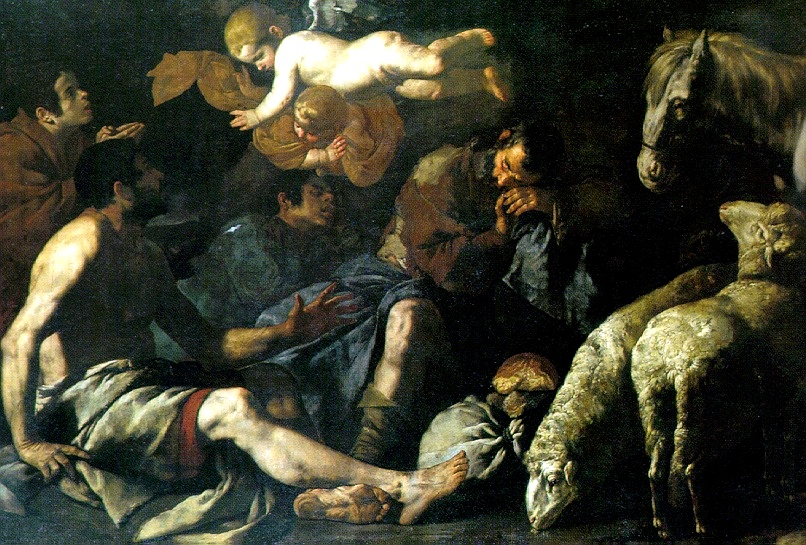
Annunciation to the Shepherds, c.1630, Museo di Capodimonte, Naples.

The Master of the Annunciation to the Shepherds was an anonymous master active in Naples, around 1620–1640. The Master's body of work was first identified by August L Mayer in the 1920s and connected to a group of works depicting the Annunciation to the Shepherds, with notable examples in Birmingham Museum and Art Gallery and the Museo di Capodimonte, Naples.

== Gallery ==
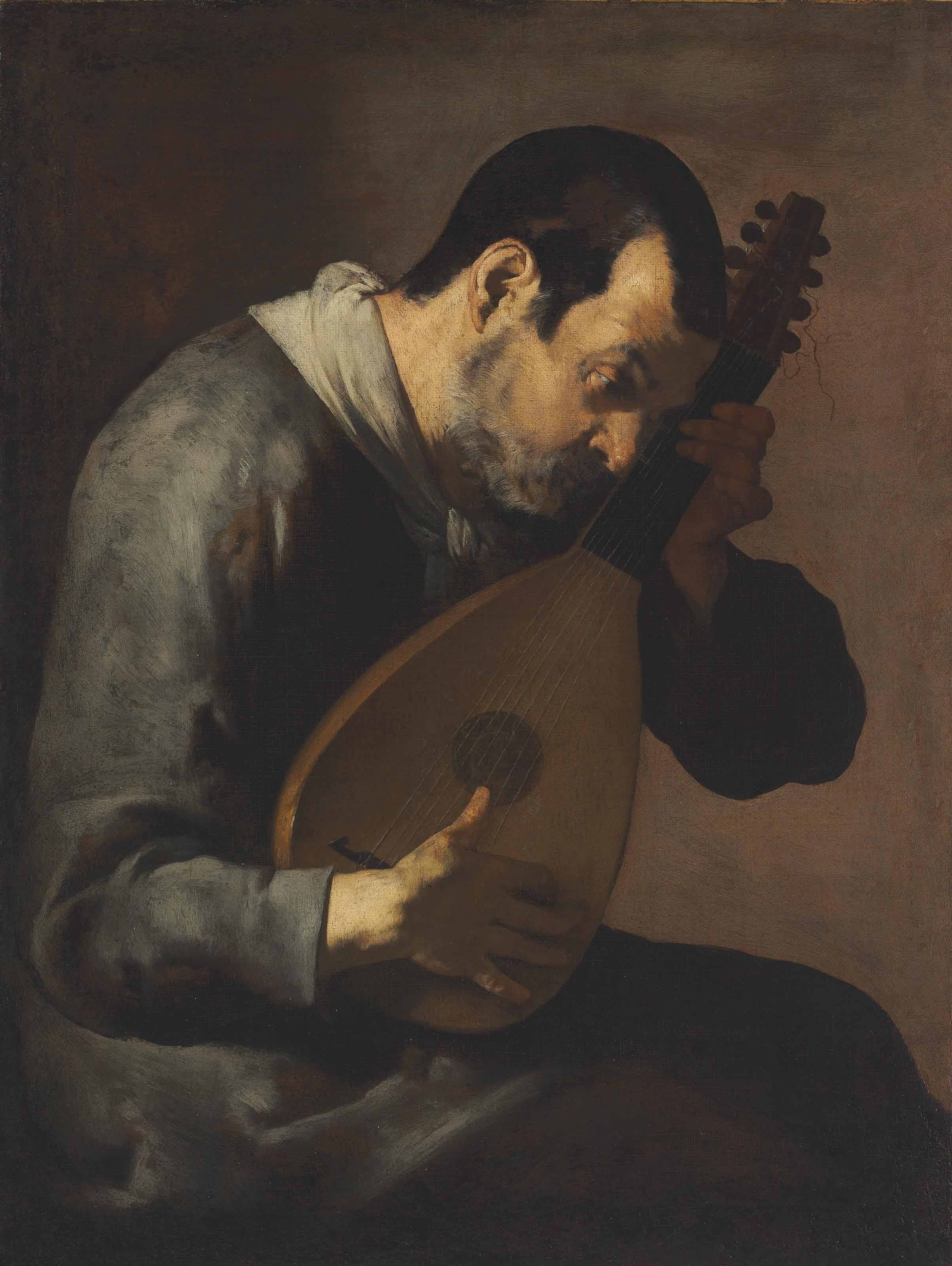
A sense of hearing, a man playing a lute

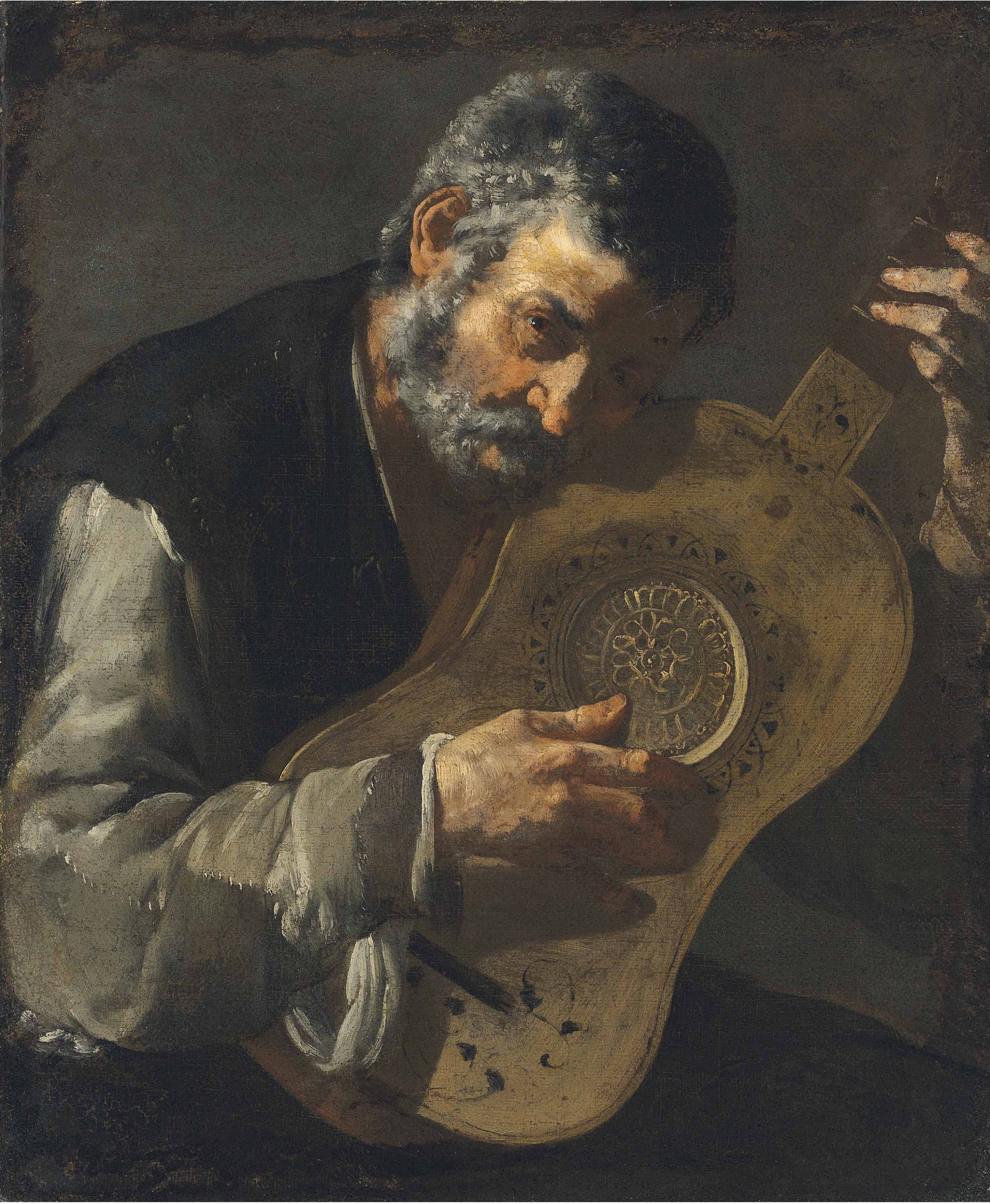
A man playing a guitar

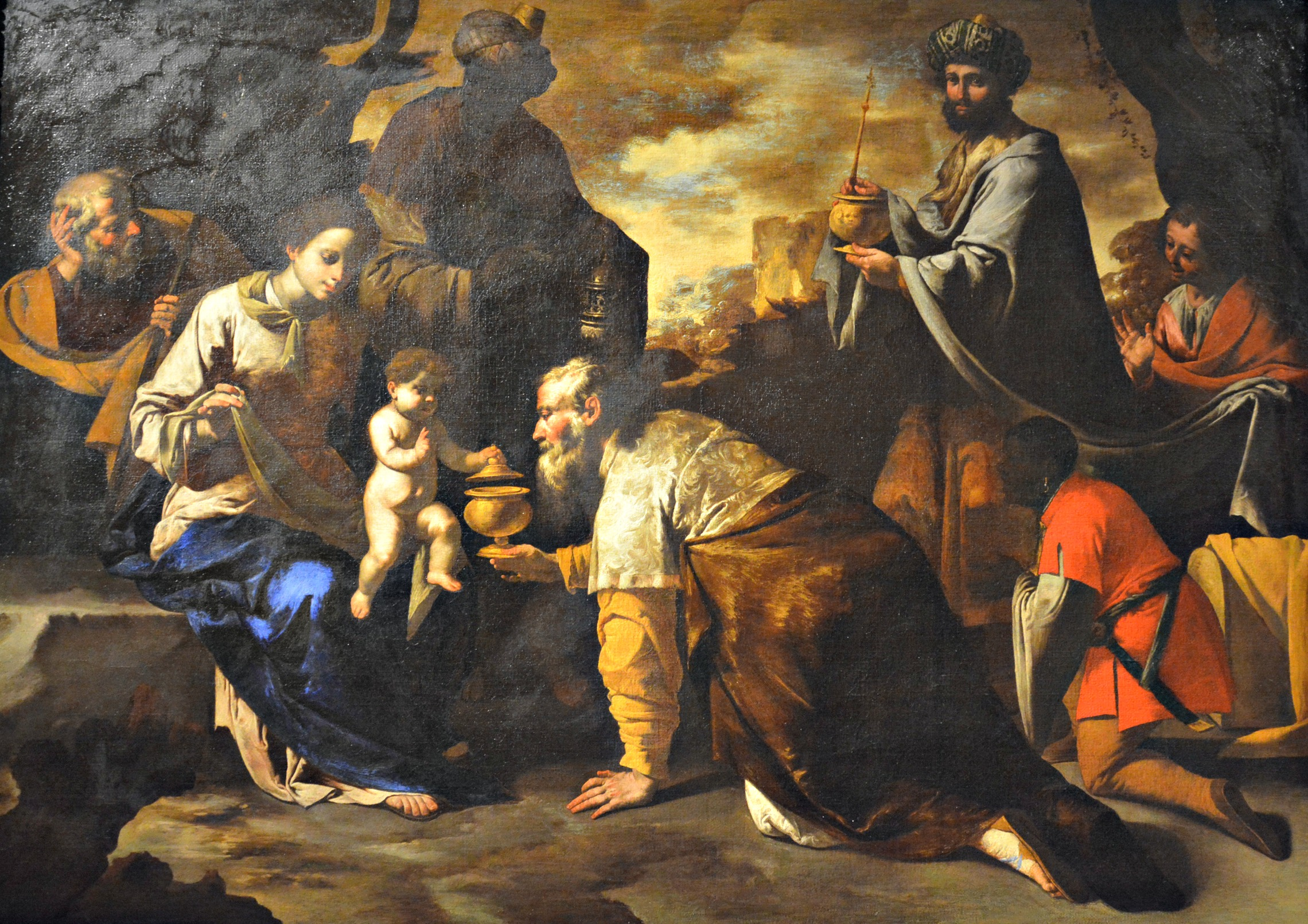
Adoration of the Magi

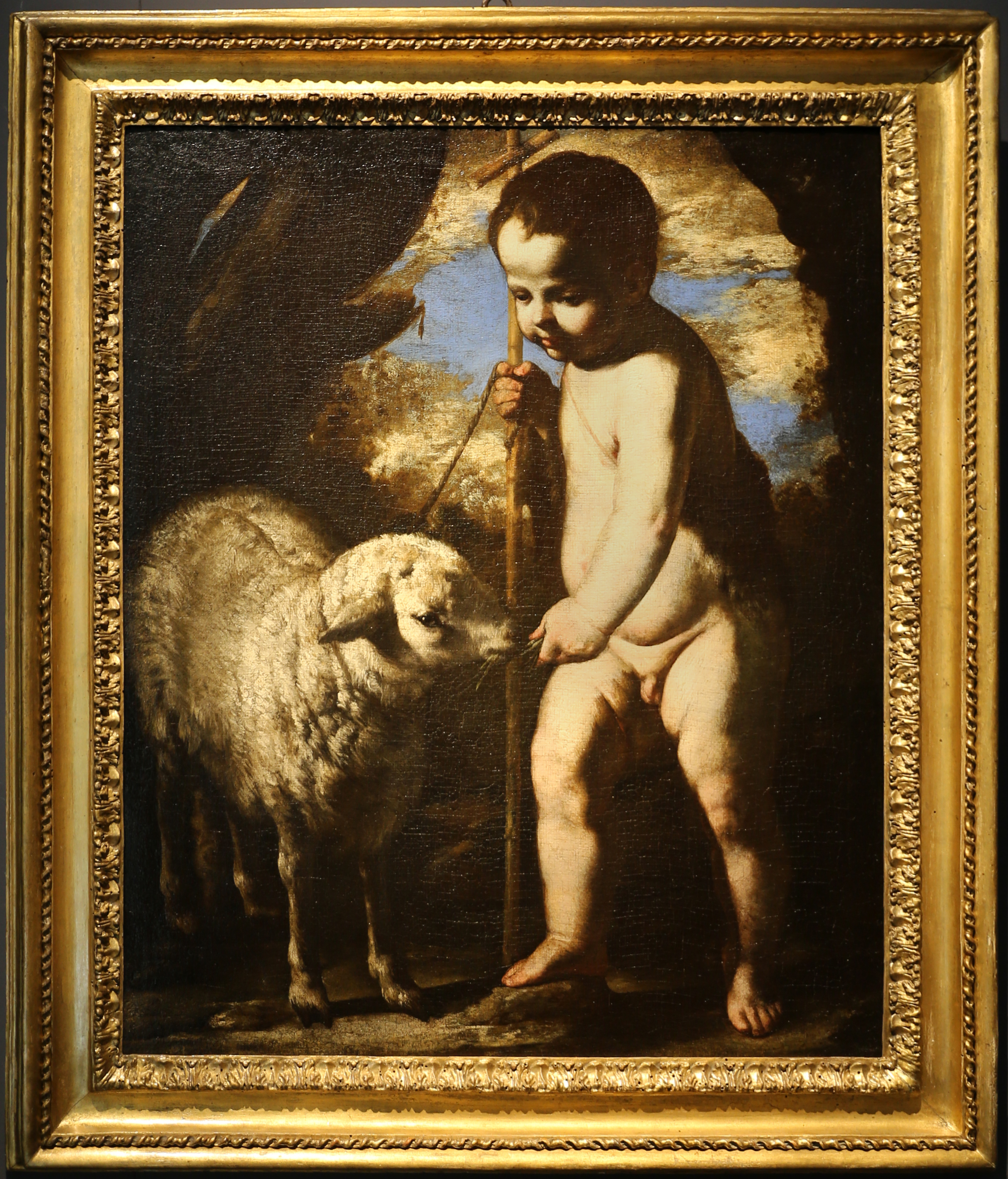
Saint John the Baptist as the Good Shepherd
