= Master of the Assisi Choirbooks =

Italian painter

The Master of the Assisi Choirbooks was an Italian manuscript illuminator active during the last quarter of the thirteenth century. Umbrian or Roman in origin, he is associated with work done for the Basilica of San Francesco d'Assisi. He seems to have known Cimabue's work for that church, and his work also indicates the influence of both the Master of the San Lorenzo Choirbooks and the Master of the Deruta-Salerno Missals.
