= Master of the Tennenbach Altar =

German painter

The Master of the Tennenbach Altar (fl. 1420–30), sometimes referred to as the Master of the Staufen Altar (German: Meister des Tennenbacher Altars; Meister des Staufener Altars), was a Gothic painter active in the Upper Rhine in the second quarter of the 15th century whose real name is unknown. His working name is taken from the altar paintings he created, formerly in Tennenbach Abbey, a Cistercian monastery in the Black Forest in Baden-Württemberg, Germany. The work is also sometimes mistakenly known as the Staufen Altar from its supposed later location in Staufen im Breisgau.

15 small panels survive of a presumed 16, 12 in the Augustinermuseum in Freiburg and three in the Staatliche Kunsthalle in Karlsruhe. They depict scenes from the Passion and from the Life of Mary.

The work is dated to around 1430 and is often compared to the work of the Master of the Upper Rhine, formerly known as the Master of the Garden of Paradise. The Master of the Tennenbach Altar appears also to be linked stylistically with Jost Haller, a painter who was active up to about 1485 in Strasbourg and Saarbrücken. Like Haller he still uses the "soft style", as it is called, of International Gothic art, but also shows the influence of contemporary Dutch Gothic painting, as for example the works of Robert Campin and his pupil Rogier van der Weyden which show the beginnings of realistic depiction of detail. Characteristic of the figures in the paintings of the Master of the Tennenbach Altar are their "almost childishly soft features".
