= Master of the Golden Altar =

German painter

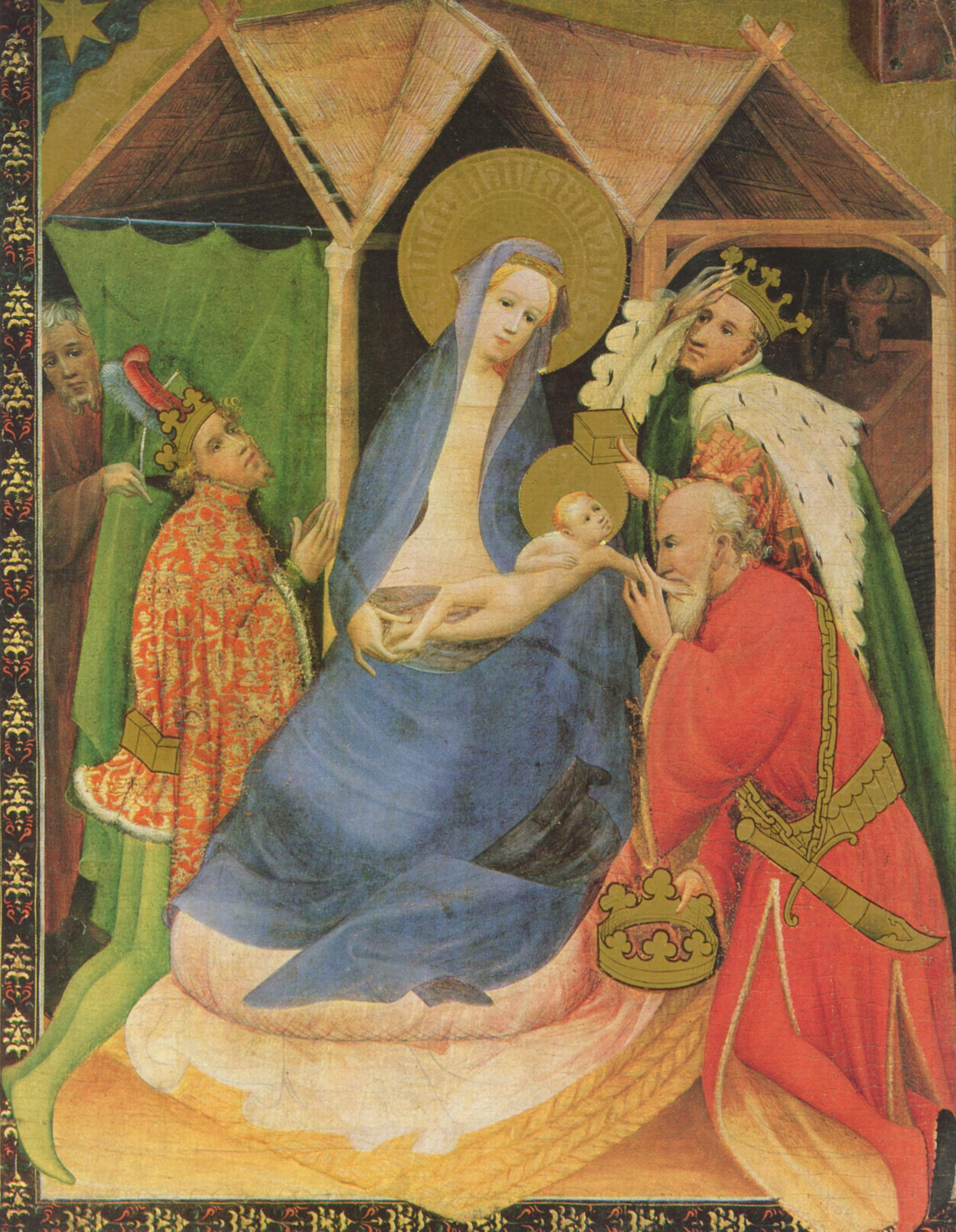
The Epiphany (c. 1425), Oil on wood, 68 × 52 cm. In the collection of the Niedersächsisches Landesmuseum

The Master of the Golden Altar (fl. c. 1431–1435) is the appellation of a German painter (in German: Meister der Goldenen Tafel) active in Lüneburg during the 15th century. His name is derived from an altarpiece dating most likely to 1418, formerly in Saint Michael's church in Lüneburg and now held by the Landesmuseum in Hannover.

The altarpiece was used both as a retable and a reliquary. It included a central panel that was initially used as an antepedium (front of the altar) and later on became the middle of a retable painted by the Master of the Golden Altar. The outsides of the wings displayed the crucifixion of Christ and the brazen snake. The insides depicted 36 events in the life of the Holy Virgin and the passion of Christ as well as pictures of holy characters from the bible. Golden reliquaries were inserted around the antependium, thus giving its name to the Golden altar. This masterpiece has been subjected to extensive research and restoration from 2012 to 2015.
