= Master of the Darup Altarpiece =

German painter

The Master of Darup or Westphalian Master, was an anonymous German painter active in Westphalia around 1420. His work is influenced by that of Conrad von Soest; his name is derived from the altarpiece in the parish church of Darup, whose central panel, a Crucifixion, uses delicate colors which appear to have been influenced by French miniature painting.
