= Master of the Friedberg Altarpiece =

German painter

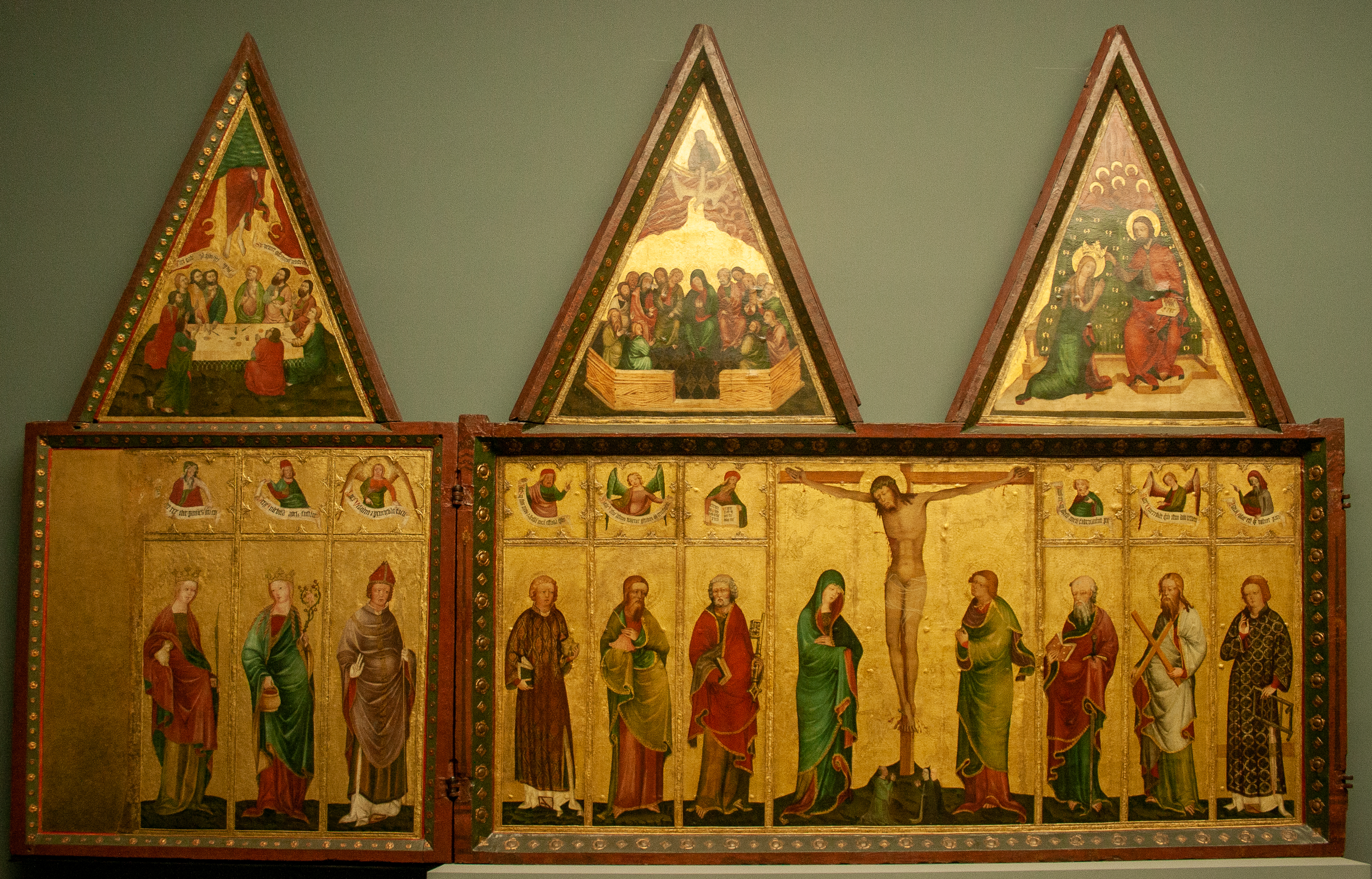
Friedberg Altarpiece, pictured 2008

The Master of the Friedberg Altarpiece (German: Meister des Friedberger Altars) was an otherwise unknown German painter, active at the end of the fourteenth century. He is named for an altarpiece painted for the church of Saint Mary in Friedberg, Hesse, known as the Greater Friedberg Altarpiece, currently in a museum collection in Darmstadt.
