= Master of Iserlohn =

German painter

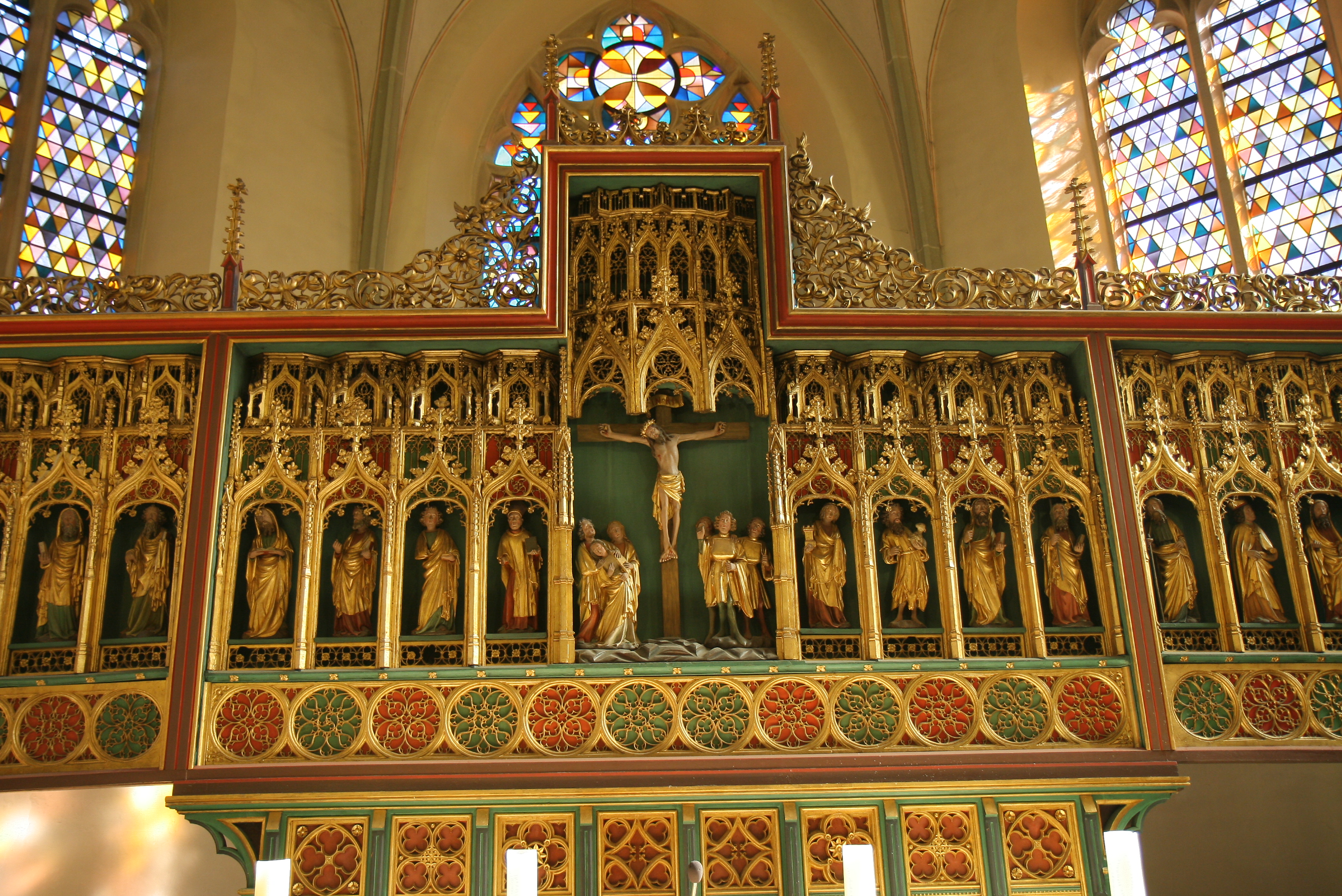
Altarpiece

The Master of Iserlohn (German: Meister von Iserlohn) was a German painter, active in Westphalia during the first third of the fifteenth century. His work shows traces of the influence of Robert Campin. His name is derived from an altarpiece in St. Mary's Church in Iserlohn.
