= Master of the Altarpiece of the Ten Commandments =

German painter

The Master of the Altarpiece of the Ten Commandments (German: Meister der Zehngebotetafel) was a German painter active in the region of Göttingen at the beginning of the fifteenth century. His name is derived from a portable altarpiece, depicting the Ten Commandments, which is believed to have at one time stood in the chapel of the Sacred Heart in Saint James Church in Göttingen, constructed in 1319.

Only the central part of the painting survives, today in the history museum in Hannover; it depicts six scenes in two registers, showing the second, third, fourth, seventh, eight, and ninth Commandments. The wings, illustrating the other four, are now lost. At the top of the composition is a half-length figure of Christ holding a scroll on which are inscribed the Commandments.

The work is widely described as the first depiction of the Ten Commandments on wooden panels. It was described as a "sumptuous achievement".
