= Guillaume Caoursin =

Vice-chancellor of the Knights Hospitaller

Guillaume Caoursin, also called Gulielmus Caoursin (1430, Douai – 1501, Rhodes), was vice-chancellor of the Order of Saint John of Jerusalem, or Knights Hospitaller. He was an eye-witness to the siege of Rhodes in 1480, an unsuccessful attack on the Hospitaller garrison led by Pierre d'Aubusson by an Ottoman fleet of 160 ships and an army of 70,000 men under the command of admiral Mesih Pasha.

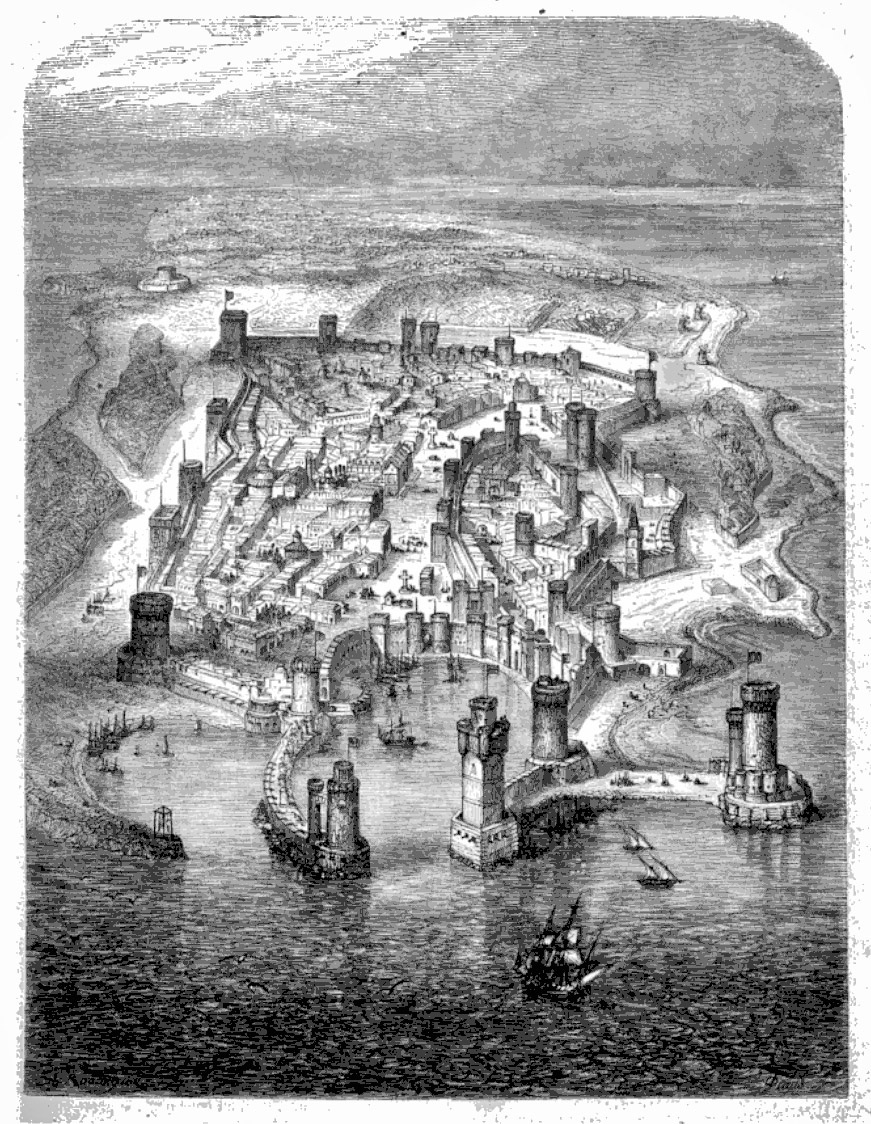
Siege de rhodes d'après Guillaume Caoursin 1480

== Biography ==
For 40 years, Caoursin was in the service of the Order of Saint John, both as vice-chancellor and in the exercise of other important functions, but did not wear the habit of the Order. In 1462, he assisted as vice-chancellor at the first general chapter, convened in Rhodes. In 1466, he accompanied the Grand Master Piero Raimondo Zacosta to Rome for the holding of a general chapter. This assembly took place in the presence of pope Paul II, and at the closing, it was ordered that those who did not wear the habit of the Order leave, but Caoursin was excepted from this measure. Zacosta died in Rome and Caoursin returned to Rhodes with the new grand master Giovanni Battista Orsini. In 1470, he was sent on an embassy to the pope to ask him for help against the Turks who threatened the island. Caoursin came into the service of his successor Pierre d'Aubusson in 1476.

He then successively fulfilled various missions, and distinguished himself during the siege of Rhodes in 1480. Shortly after this siege, he married and d'Aubusson, recognizing the services he had rendered to the Order in the new compilation of legal statutes, presented him with a thousand gold florins. In 1484, he was ambassador to pope Innocent VIII. The latter charmed by his eloquence and skill, appointed him as Count Palatine, making him apostolic secretary.

On July 5, 1816, a relic of Caoursin was discovered in the chapel of the house of Notre-Dame de Douai, which, since the destruction of the Templars, belonged to the Hospitallers. It was a stone tumulaire two meters long by one meter wide on which is incised the image of a Hospitaller commander with this inscription

Ci git religieuse personne frère Guillaume Caoursin en son temps commandeur de Monddier et de Dourges, gard et gouverneur de la command de Hautavaines, qui trépassa l’an mil CCC LV, le XXIV à aoust.

This epitaph is dedicated to either Caoursin, his uncle, who is possibly his real father. The stone found in the Temple was found in the gardens of the Lodge of the Freemasons of Douai.

A history of the siege was also provided by Pierre d'Aubusson in his Account of the Siege of Rhodes which was included in The History of the Holy, Military, Sovereign Order of St. John of Jerusalem (1852) by John Taaffe, an English historian and Knight Commander of the Sovereign Order of St. John of Jerusalem. D'Aubusson's biography Histoire de Pierre d'Aubusson (1667) by French Jesuit Dominique Bouhours (1628–1702) is also of interest.

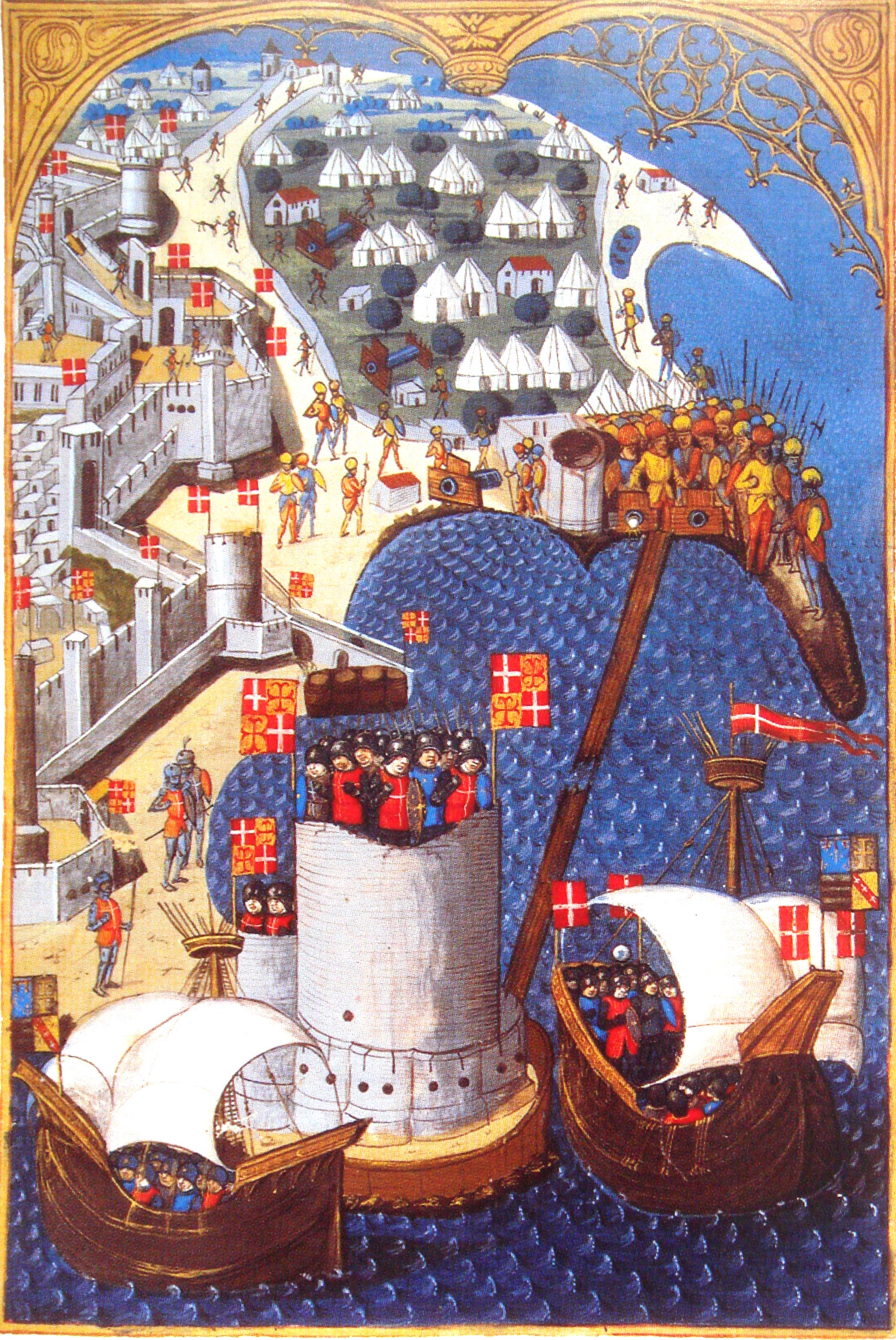
The 1480 Siege of Rhodes.

== Works ==
The works of Gulielmus Caoursin include the following.

- Obsidionis Rhodiæ urbis descriptio (1480). Caoursin's account of the siege of Rhodes. English translation by English poet John Caius (fl. 1480). Reprinted in Edward Gibbon's The Crusades. Full title: The Delectable Newwesse and Tithynges of the Glorious Victory of the Rhodyans against the Turkes.
- Primordium et origo sacri Xenodochii atque Ordinis militiae Sancti Joannis Baptistae Hospitalariorum Hierosolimitani (1489). In Recueil des historiens des croisades (RHC) Historiens occidentaux, Volume 5.IX.v.i.
- Le fondement du S. Hospital de l'ordre de la chevalerie de S. Jehan Baptiste de Jerusalem (1493). In RHC Historiens occidentaux, Volume 5.IX.v.ii.
- De terræ motûs labore, quo Rhodii affecti sunt (1496). An account of the earthquake at Rhodes in 1481.
- Oratio in senatu Rhodiorum, de morte Turci, habita pridie Kalendas junias M.CCC.LXXXI (1496). Speech to the senate of Rhodes on the death of Ottoman sultan Mehmed II in 1481.
- Gestorum Rhodiae obsidionis commentarii (1496). Two illuminated manuscripts conserved at the Bibliothèque nationale de France, with 51 miniatures attributed to the maître du Cardinal de Bourbon.
- Hospitaller Piety and Crusader Propaganda (2015). Guillaume Caoursin's description of the Ottoman siege of Rhodes, by Theresa M. Vann and Donald J. Kagay.

Johann Snell printed Obsidionis Rhodiae Urbis Descriptio in Denmark in 1482, and this printing is one of the first two book printings in Denmark.

== See also ==
- Cartulaire général de l'Ordre des Hospitaliers

== Bibliography ==
- Josserand, Philippe (2009). Prier et combattre, Dictionnaire européen des ordres militaires au Moyen Âge. Fayard, Paris. ISBN 978-2213627205.
- Lock, Peter (2006). The Routledge Companion to the Crusades. Routledge. doi:10.4324/9780203389638. ISBN 0-415-39312-4.
- Murray, Alan V. (2006). The Crusades—An Encyclopedia. ABC-CLIO. ISBN 978-1-57607-862-4.
- Nicholson, Helen J. (2001). The Knights Hospitaller. Boydell & Brewer. ISBN 978-1843830382.
- Rossi, Ettore (1975). The Hospitallers at Rhodes, 1421–1523 (PDF). A History of the Crusades (Setton), Volume III.
- Runciman, Steven (1954). A History of the Crusades, Volume Three: The Kingdom of Acre and the Later Crusades. Cambridge University Press. ISBN 978-0521347723.
- Setton, Kenneth M. (1969). A History of the Crusades. Six Volumes. University of Wisconsin Press.
- Vann, Theresa M. (2006). Order of the Hospital. The Crusades––An Encyclopedia, pp. 598–605.
- Vissière, Laurent (2007). Guillaume Caoursin: une conscience européenne en Méditerranée. Méridiennes. OpenEdition Books. pp. 255–275. ISBN 9782810709663.
- Vissière, Laurent (2014). "Tousles deables d'enfer. Relations du siège de Rhodes par les Ottomans en 1480". Cahiers de Recherches Médiévales et Humanistes. Journal of Medieval and Humanistic Studies. Éditions Droz, Genève.
