= Siege of Rhodes (1480) =

Ottoman siege against the Knights Hospitaller

Coordinates: 36.4423°N 28.2270°E

- Part of the Ottoman wars in Europe
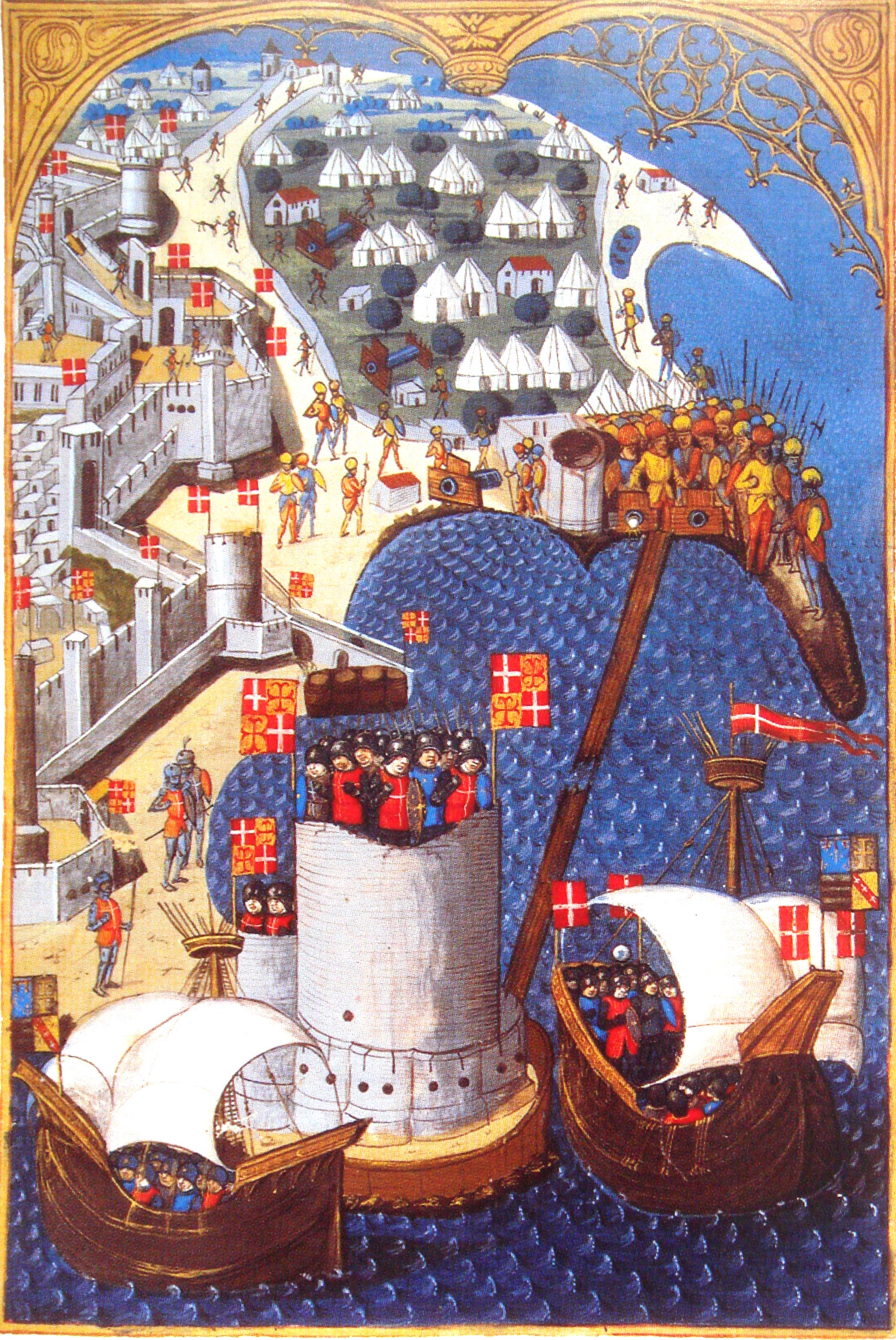
- Depiction of the 1480 siege. Neapolitan ships are in the forefront, while the Turkish camp is visible in the background.
Date	23 May – 17 August 1480 (2 months, 3 weeks and 4 days)
Location	Rhodes
Result	Knights Hospitaller victory

Belligerents
Ottoman Empire	(Sovereign Military Order of Malta) Knights Hospitaller

Commanders and leaders
(Ottoman Empire) Mesih Pasha	(Sovereign Military Order of Malta) Pierre d'Aubusson (Sovereign Military Order of Malta) Antoine d'Aubusson

Strength
70,000 men 100 or 160 ships Probably between 10,000 and 15,000 men Not more than 20,000 3,000 janissaries	500+ knights 2,000+ soldiers Probably numbered about 3,500 men or 300+ knights 300 sergeants, 3,000–4,000 soldiers.

Casualties and losses
9,000 killed 15,000 wounded	Unknown

The Siege of Rhodes of 1480 was the first attempt by the Ottoman Empire to seize the island stronghold of the Knights Hospitaller of Rhodes. Despite the Ottomans being numerically superior with 70,000 troops, the Knights successfully defended the island.

== Background ==
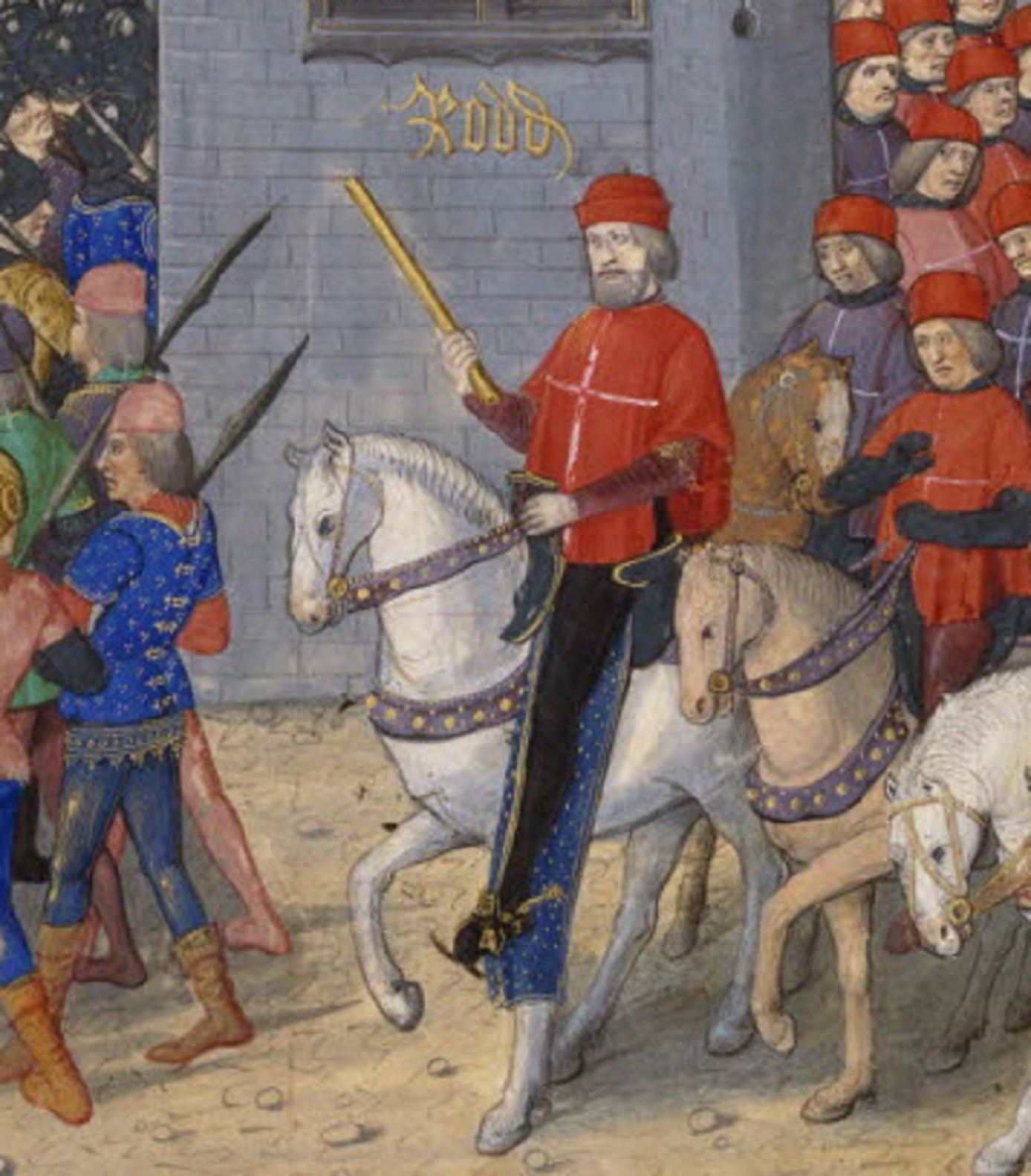
Miniature depicting Pierre d'Aubusson inspecting his soldiers, from the Gestorum Rhodie obsidionis commentarii

By 1310, the Knights Hospitaller had conquered the island of Rhodes. Beginning in the 1330s, an alliance formed between Byzantium, Venice, and the Knights, with the aim of combating Ottoman corsairs who were threatening the trade routes between Europe and Constantinople. Rhodes served as a strategically important stronghold from which Ottoman attacks could be contained. The alliance achieved only limited success, as it was unable to prevent the expansion of the Ottoman Empire. After the Fall of Constantinople in 1453, the Ottomans demanded tribute payments from the Hospitallers, which they refused to pay.

== Attack ==
Portrait depicting the victory of Pierre d'Aubusson at Rhodes, from the Bibliothèque nationale de France

On 23 May 1480, an Ottoman fleet of 160 ships appeared before Rhodes, at the Gulf of Trianda, along with an army of 70,000 men under the command of Mesih Pasha. The Knights Hospitaller garrison was led by Grand Master Pierre d'Aubusson.

The Ottomans' first goal was to capture the Fortress of Saint Nicholas, a strategic point for the knights' defence of the two harbours: Mandraki Port, and the one to the east bay of Akandia. The Turkish artillery kept up an unbroken bombardment and, from 9 June on, the infantry made a series of attacks. Grand Master d'Aubusson himself sped to the aid of the garrison and the enemy was repelled after a fierce struggle.

A second attack on the town occurred on the eastern sector of the wall near the Jewish quarter, towards the bay of Akandia, which was the battle station of the "tongue" of Italy and was quite weak. The Knights and townspeople dug a new moat on the inside of the wall at this point and constructed a new internal fortification, while bombardment from the Turkish artillery was ongoing. Once again the Knights defended the town, and after a bitter battle with many casualties on both sides, the danger was once more averted.

At dawn on 27 July, the Turks launched a vigorous offensive and their vanguard of around 2,500 Janissaries managed to take the tower of Italy and enter the city. A frenzied struggle ensued. The grand master, wounded in five places, directed the battle and fought with lance in hand. After three hours of fighting the enemy were decimated and the exhausted survivors began to withdraw. The Knights' counter-attack caused the Turks to beat a disorderly retreat, dragging along with them the vizier and commander-in-chief. The Hospitallers reached as far as his tent and took, along with other booty, the holy standard of Islam. On that day, between three and four thousand Turks were slain.

On August 17, 1480, the Ottoman fleet gave up their attempt to capture Rhodes. Sultan Mehmed II was furious and would have attacked the island again, but his death in 1481 put a stop to the attempt. In 1522, the Ottomans besieged Rhodes once again and captured the city and island.

== Historiography ==
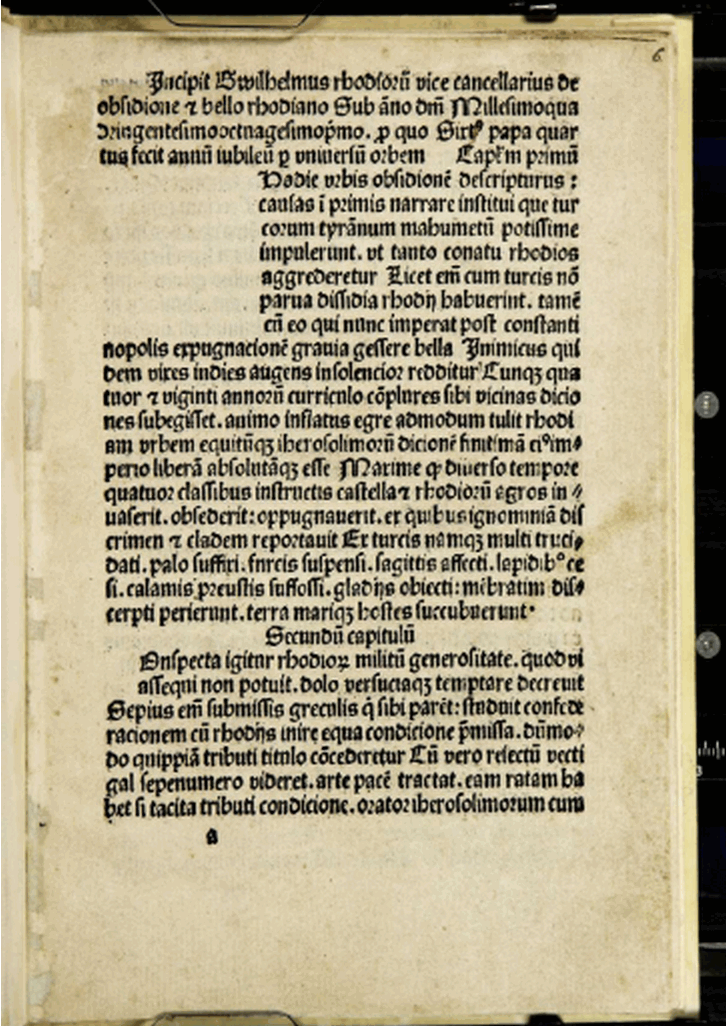
Page from Obsidionis Rhodiae urbis descriptio.

Gulielmus Caoursin, vice-chancellor of the Knights Hospitaller, was an eye-witness of the siege and wrote its description in his Obsidionis Rhodiae Urbis Descriptio (an English translation exists as a part of Edward Gibbon's Crusades). An earlier English translation was the work of John Caius the Elder (printed 1481–84). D'Aubusson's own report on the siege can be found in John Taaffe's history of the Holy, military, sovereign order of st. John of Jerusalem.

Johann Snell printed Obsidionis Rhodiae Urbis Descriptio in Odense, Denmark in 1482, and this printing is regarded as, if not the first, then one of the first two book printings in Denmark.

== Gallery ==
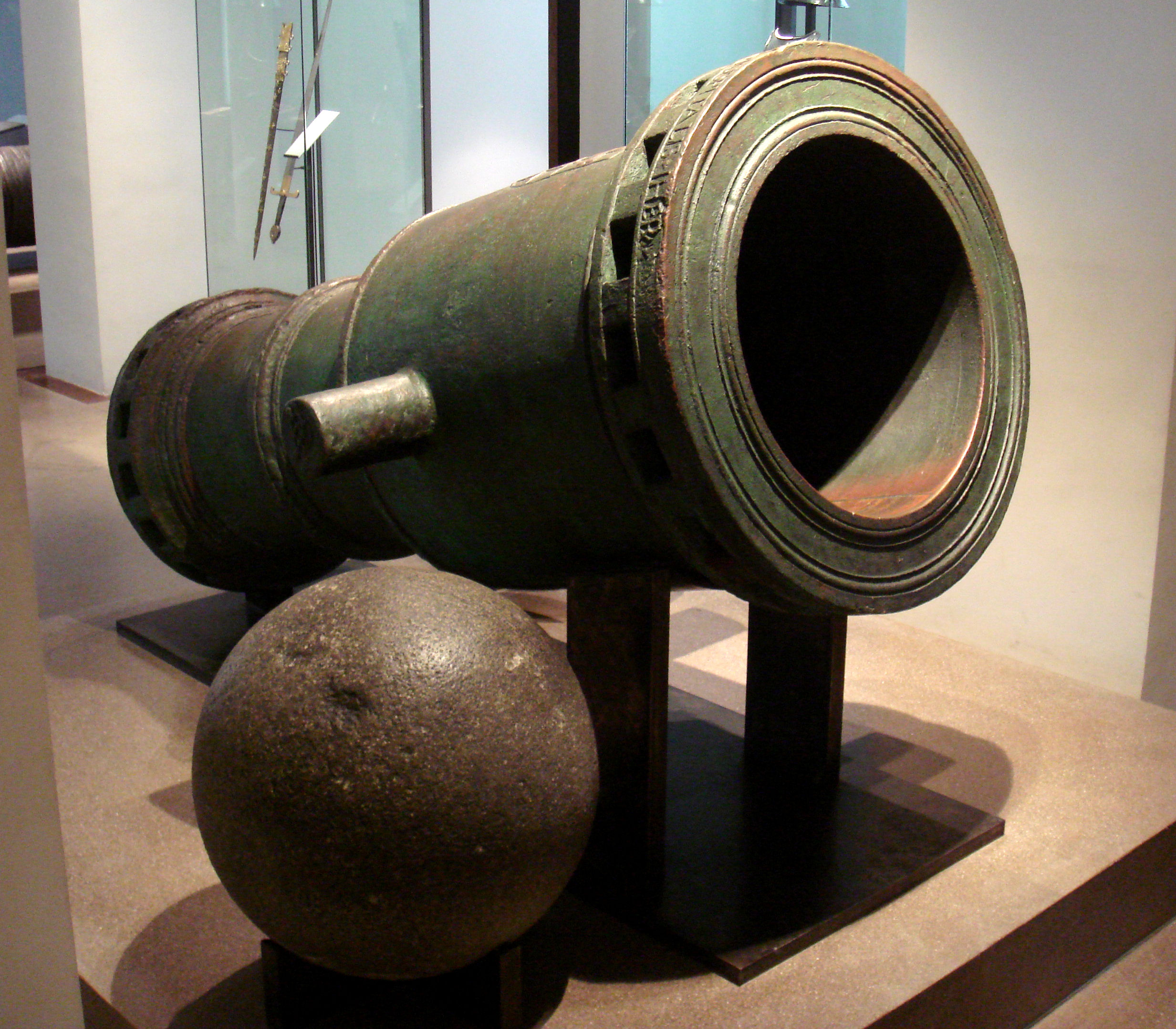
Bombard-Mortar of the Knights of Saint John of Jerusalem, Rhodes, 1480–1500. Founded at the request of Pierre d'Aubusson, the bombard was used for close defense of the walls (100-200 meters). It fired 260 kg granite balls. The bombard weighs 3,325 kg. Exhibited at the Musée de l'Armée, Paris.

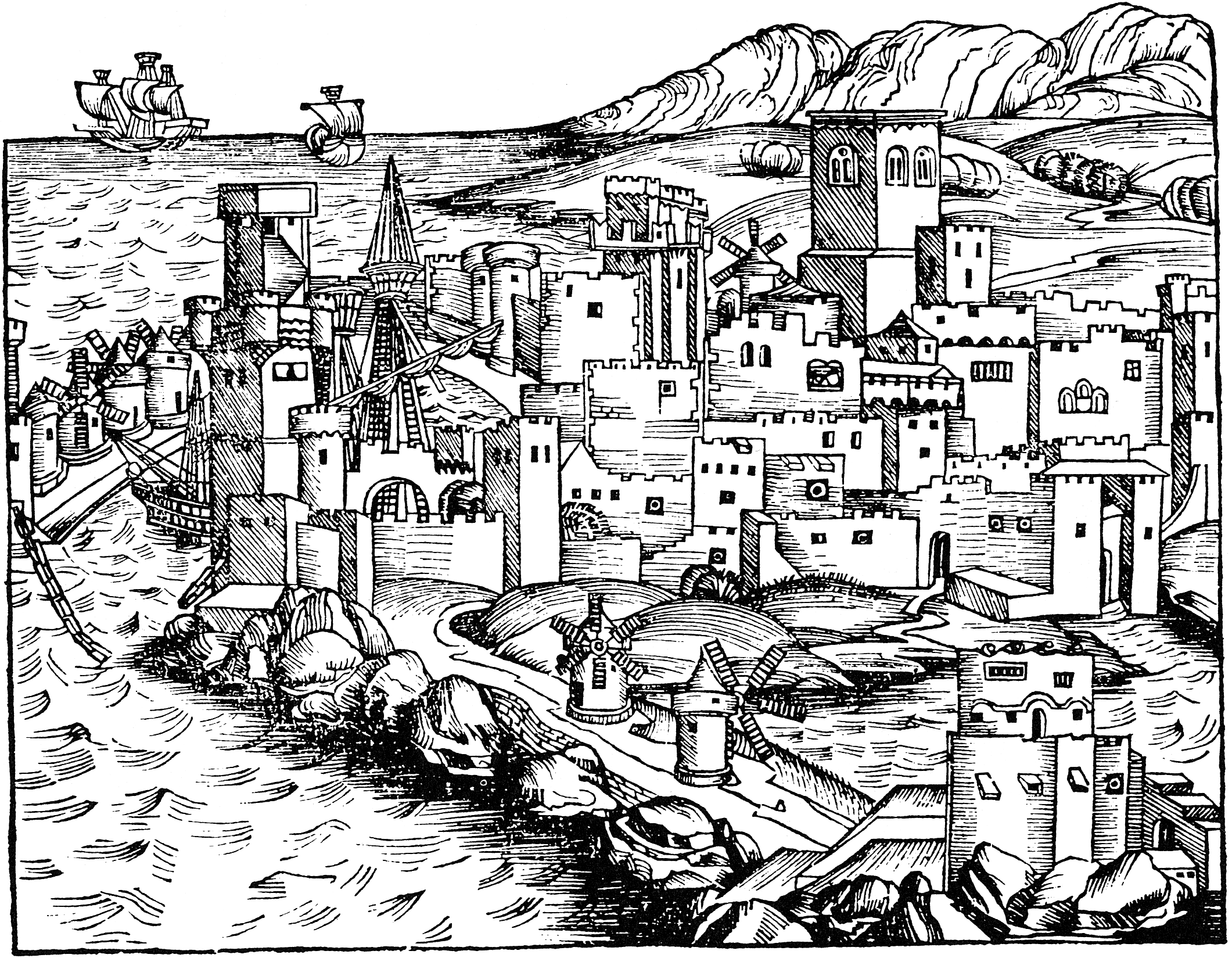
A view of Rhodes 10 years later.

== See also ==
- Our Lady of Philermos

== Bibliography ==
- Edbury, Peter; et al. (The New Cambridge Medieval History) (2008). "Christian and Muslims in the eastern Mediterranean". In Michael Jones (ed.). c. 1300–c. 1415. Vol. VI. Cambridge: Cambridge UniversityPress. ISBN 0-521-36290-3.
- Bryer, Anthony; et al. (The New Cambridge Medieval History) (2008). "Byzantium: The Roman Orthodox World 1393-1492". In Christopher Allmand (ed.). c. 1415–c. 1500. Vol. VII. Cambridge: Cambridge University Press. ISBN 0-521-38296-3.
- Babinger, Franz (1978). Mehmed the Conqueror and his Time. Princeton: Princeton University Press.
- Carr, John C. (2016). The Knights Hospitaller: a Military History of the Knights of St John. Barnsley: Pen and Sword. ISBN 1-4738-5890-9.
- Kollias, Elias (1994). The knights of Rhodes - the palace and the city. Athens: Ekdotike Athenon. ISBN 9-6021-3242-6.
- Setton, Kenneth M. (1984). The Sixteenth Century to the Reign of Julius III. The Papacy and the Levant. Vol. III. American Philosophical Society. ISBN 0-8716-9161-2.
- Erik Svane & Dan Greenberg, Croisade vers la Terre Sainte (Geneva, 2007)
- Smith, Robert Douglas and DeVries, Kelly (2011), Rhodes Besieged. A new history, Stroud: The History Press, ISBN 978-0-7524-6178-6
- Dulska, A. K. (2024). The Siege of Rhodes of 1480: Textual and Iconographic Sources for an Underwater Archaeological Search. International Journal of Nautical Archaeology, 1–28. https://doi.org/10.1080/10572414.2024.2314173
