= Master of the Jardin de vertueuse consolation =

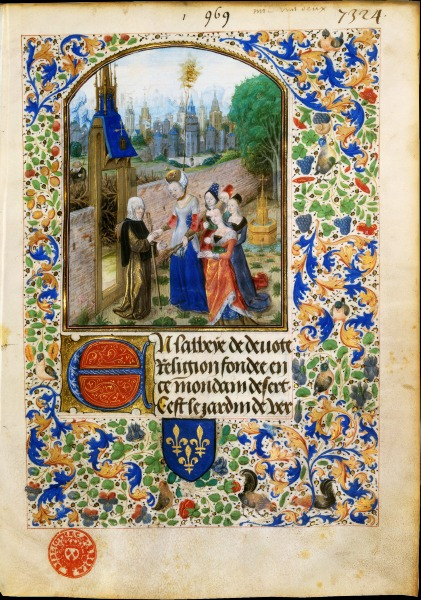
Miniature from Le Jardin de vertueuse consolation, f.1r.

The Master of the Jardin de vertueuse consolation is the Notname of an illuminator active in Bruges in the years 1450 to 1475. He owes his name to a work by Pierre d'Ailly of which the decoration has been attributed to him, Le Jardin de vertueuse consolation, executed for Louis de Gruuthuse and today preserved in the Bibliothèque nationale de France as ms. fr. 1026.

== Biographical and stylistic notes ==
The style of the Master was described by the Belgian art historian Maximiliaan P. J. Martens who discerned his hand in certain manuscripts which had up to that time been attributed to the Master of Margaret of York. He would, on this reading, have been an associate of the Master of Margaret of York who developed a more polished style. His figures are drawn in a more skilful and precise way, his colour palette richer and more subtle than his master, and he shows more attention in the rendering of materials. He could have been trained in the entourage of Lieven van Lathem, and worked for prestigious clients like Louis de Gruuthuse.

The existence of the master is however questioned by the French art historian Pascal Schandel: he argued that the manuscript of Le Jardin de vertueuse consolation is indeed from the hand of the Master of Margaret of York himself and the fine quality of the miniatures relative to his usual production simply shows that he has brought himself up to the level of the quality of his patrons.
