= Master of Margaret of York =

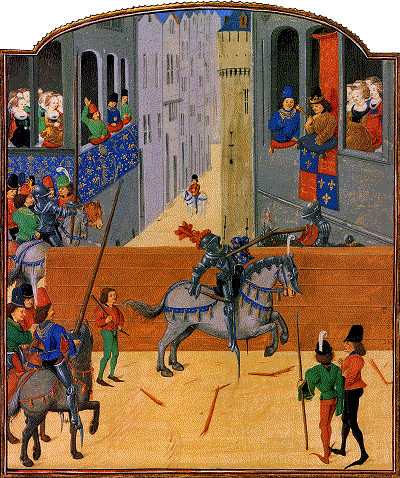
Jean de Wavrin, Chroniques d'Angleterre. Paris, Bibliothèque nationale de France, MS Fr. 87, f. 58^{v}

The Master of Margaret of York is the Notname of an illuminator active in Bruges between 1470 and 1480. He owes his name to a devotional book he decorated for Margaret of York, wife of Charles the Bold, Duke of Burgundy. A large number of his illuminated books were executed for Louis de Gruuthuse. Several manuscripts have also been attributed to his assistants.

== Patrons ==
The style of this anonymous master was first characterized by the German art historian Friedrich Winkler in 1925. He was undoubtedly an illuminator working in Bruges. Although his name is linked to Margaret of York, Duchess of Burgundy and Countess of Flanders, he actually worked much more for Louis de Gruuthuse, Stadtholder of Holland and Zeeland, for whom he painted about fifteen manuscripts, mostly saints' lives and translations of classical works. The illuminator must have been very close to his patron, because he five times painted portraits or members of his family. So much so that another art historian, Ottokar Smital, preferred to call him the Master of Louis of Bruges. He also took orders from Anthony, bastard of Burgundy.

== Style ==
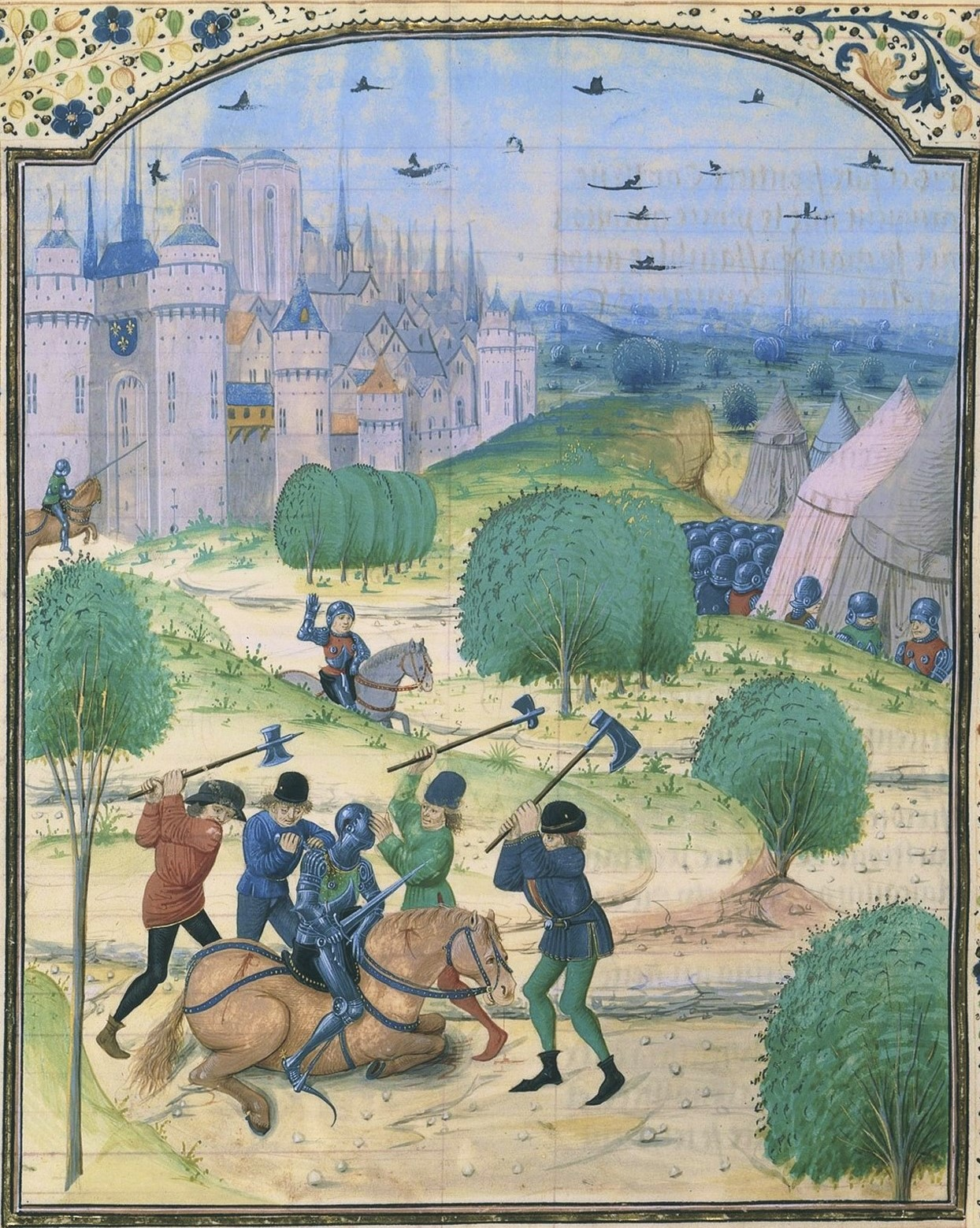
Jean de Wavrin, Chroniques d'Angleterre. Paris, Bibliothèque nationale de France, MS Fr. 87, f. 299^{v}

The style of the master and its application vary according to the subject of the miniature, and according to the importance of the work ordered. Thus, the characters are more or less detailed according to their importance in the story, some being limited to simple sketches. The landscapes and the settings are generally not very detailed, and the artist shows little concern with their lifelikeness. On the other hand, he highlights the action evoked by the text and the main characters by embodied and expressive faces. His style is often reminiscent of that of Lieven van Lathem. He doubtless worked with assistants in an atelier, entrusting the decoration and other less important elements to them.

His production is so abundant and varied that historians tend to attribute part of it to his assistants, and have managed to distinguish certain artists such as the Master of Fitzwilliam 268, with a more tense and agitated style, the Master of the Genealogia Deorum of Bruges, with a looser style, the Master of the Jardin de vertueuse consolation or the Master of the Life of Saint Colette of Ghent. His style has also been compared to that of the Master of the Moral Treatises, whom he influenced.
