= Johann Snell =

German printer

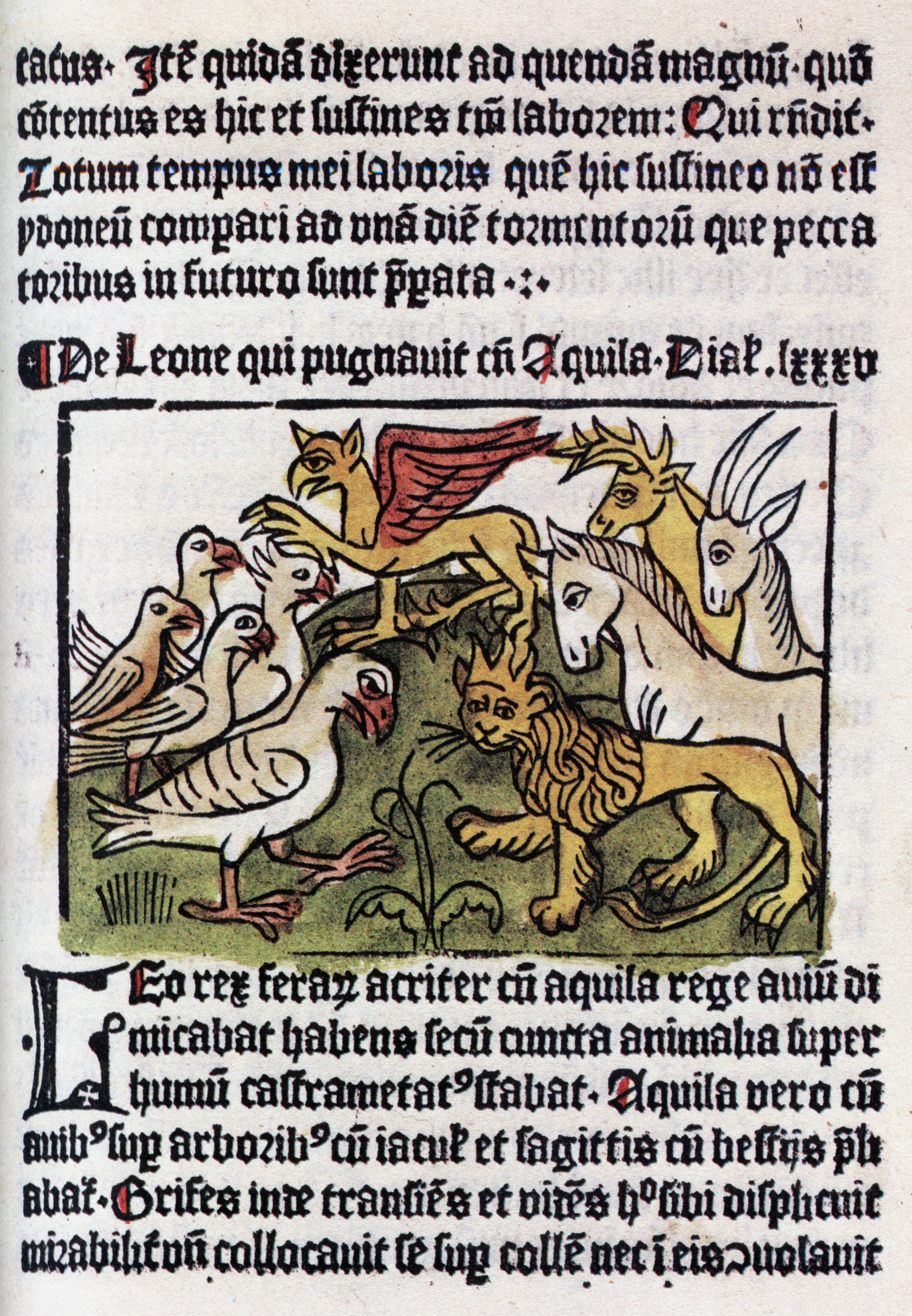
Page from Dialogus creaturarum, the first book printed in Sweden, by Johann Snell in 1483

Johann Snell (fl. 1482; died after 1519) was a German printer. He appears to have been born in Hannover and was in Rostock in 1475, where he apparently served his apprenticeship with the Brotherhood of St. Michael, and in Lübeck in 1480, where he was an independent printer and bookbinder. He may also have studied at the University of Rostock in 1481.

In 1482 he was brought by Bishop Karl Rønnov to Odense to print a short prayer book (breviary), Breviarium Ottoniense. At the same time, presumably for another ecclesiastical client such as the Knights of St. John, Snell printed De obsidione et bello Rhodiano, an account of the Turkish siege of the island of Rhodes. These are the first two books printed in Denmark. While in Stockholm in 1483–84, he also produced the first book printed in Sweden, Dialogus creaturarum, a richly illustrated volume dated 1483. He appears to have been brought to Sweden to print a missal for the Archbishopric of Uppsala, known as Missale Upsalense vetus, which typographic evidence shows him to have printed in Stockholm in late 1484. He apparently then returned to Lübeck, where the last record of him is in 1519.
