= Crucifixion from Nové Sady (Master of the Rajhrad Altarpiece) =

Painting by the Master of the Rajhrad Altarpiece

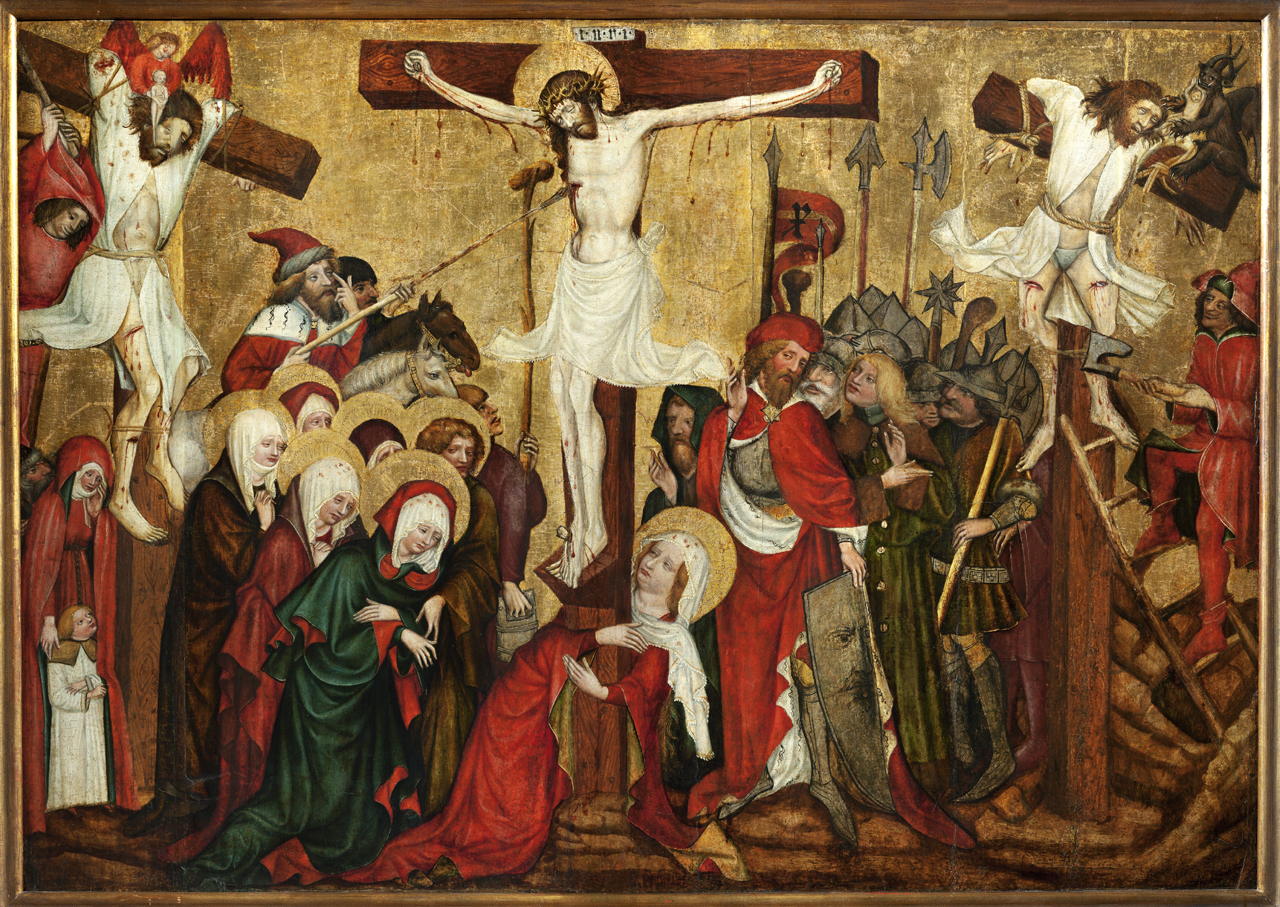
Crucifixion from Nové Sady, Master of the Rajhrad Altarpiece, National Gallery in Prague

Crucifixion from Nové Sady, (also referred to as the Crucifixion of the Rajhrad Altarpiece, the Crucifixion of the Olomouc, Altar of the Holy Cross, or the Novosady panel) is part of a larger altar polyptych called the Rajhrad Altarpiece (around 1440). Its author is the last important personality of Czech panel painting of the pre-Hussite period, known as the Master of the Rajhrad Altarpiece. The painting is on display in the permanent exhibition of the National Gallery in Prague.

== History of the painting ==
The Master of the Rajhrad Altarpiece probably had a workshop in Prague and retreated to Moravia after the outbreak of the Hussite Wars in 1420-1440, only to return to Prague during the reign of Sigismund. The altar with the theme of the Adoration of the Holy Cross, together with another Gothic altar, was intended for the church of St Maurice in Olomouc, as confirmed by written records from 1424 and 1440. From there, five panels of the altar were transferred to the picture gallery of the Benedictine monastery in Rajhrad during the reconstruction of the church in 1784 and are now in the possession of the Moravian Gallery in Brno. The two-sided painted wings of the altar were cut lengthwise and separated, but only the face of the altar was preserved.

The central panel with the Crucifixion was donated to the newly built church of St Philip in Nové Sady near Olomouc. There, the panel was discovered by Albert Kutal in 1935, and in 1935-1936 the Crucifixion was exhibited in Brno and in 1937 it was purchased for the State Collection of Old Art (now the National Gallery Prague). As many as ten panels from the original altar were destroyed in Nové Sady at an unspecified time in the late 19th century.

== Description and classification ==
The painting is done in tempera on a fir wood panel covered with linen (height 102 cm, width 142 cm). There is no consensus on the date of the work. Older literature places the painting in 1420, or before 1427, when the three-part winged altarpiece with the Crucifixion (now in Keresztény Múzeum, Esztergom) by Master Thomas De Coloswar was created, allegedly influenced by the Nové Sady painting. Other scholars dispute the much later dating of around 1452, proposed by Bartlová. According to more recent literature, the painting dates from around 1440 and may have been commissioned by Sigismund's chaplain Heinrich Seuftleben.

The panel with the Crucifixion formed the central part of the altar, together with the scene of the Carrying of the Cross; the wings had three Passion scenes: the Last Supper, Christ on the Mount of Olives (or Prayer in the Garden of Gethsemane), and the Resurrection of Christ and as the fourth: The finding and testing of the true Holy Cross by St Helena and Constantine.

Older expert opinions have described the paintings of the Rajhrad altarpiece as works based on the beautiful style and affected by Franco-flemish influences, manifested by an attempt to deepen the pictorial space or naturalistic details. The Master of the Rajhrad Altarpiece continued the tradition established by the Master of the Třeboň Altarpiece, especially in the composition of the image of Christ on the Mount of Olives, in the detail of the landscape or in the use of chiaroscuro. Otherwise, his work follows the late beautiful style of the first two decades of the 15th century, which combines traditional typification of figures and draperies with new tendencies that abandon the earlier formalism. It emphasizes the plot and narrative component, complements the main scene with a multitude of figures and genre scenes, and gives the characters individual, sometimes even caricatured expressions. His paintings are not intended for worship, but for personal contemplation. In the second panel with the Christ Carrying the Cross, which formed the lower part of the central part of the altarpiece, the painter attempted a two-plane arrangement of space and a graduated scale of figures.

The compositional scheme of the Crucifixion painting is close to the miniature in the Hasenburg-Missale and the Crucifixion from St Barbara chapel (workshop of the Master of the Třeboň Altarpiece); some specific motifs, such as the figures of robbers dressed in long flowing robes, are also found in the Crucifixion from Zátoň, Crucifixion from Skalice and Reininghaus altar. A drawing book may have served as a model for figures, while Western influences were probably mediated by book illuminations (Master of the Gerona Martyrology).

The work, which depicts a scene of the Great Calvary, uses a less common landscape format and populates the scene with a number of assistant figures. The composition of the two main groups on either side is in the form of triangles with the tops pointing towards the arms of the cross. On the left is Mary and St John and the group of women from the Gospels, with Longinus and his spear behind them, piercing Christ's side. St Mary Magdalene, embracing the Cross of Christ, is the central figure and represents a contemporary departure from the Marian cult. On the right side, led by centurion, is a group of soldiers in red robes who converted to the faith after Christ's death. There are figures in the painting that are difficult to identify - a hooded old man at the foot of the cross on the right, a woman and child dressed as an altar boy on the left (donors or spectators?). If, as M. Bartlová suggests, Ladislaus the Posthumous (the young fair-haired man on the right) and King George of Poděbrady (the face on the left) were depicted, then the dating of the painting would have to be much later. The depiction of a drastic scene with scoundrels cutting the legs of robbers is more common in Italian painting (Barna da Siena, Jacopo di Cione, Giusto de' Menabuoi), but it is not commonly found in Central Europe.

The background of the painting is gilded and the deepening of the space is only suggested by the slant of the crosses or the leaning ladder. Analysis of the painting reveals underdrawings guided by one hand, but workshop assistants were probably involved in completing the painting.

=== Works attributed to the Master of the Rajhrad Altarpiece ===
- around 1425 (?) Double-sided painted panel from the castle in Náměšt' nad Oslavou with scenes of the Passion of St. Katherina, the Passion of St. Apolena
- around 1430-36 St. James Altar (Minorite Church of St. James in Prague or Church of St. James in Brno)
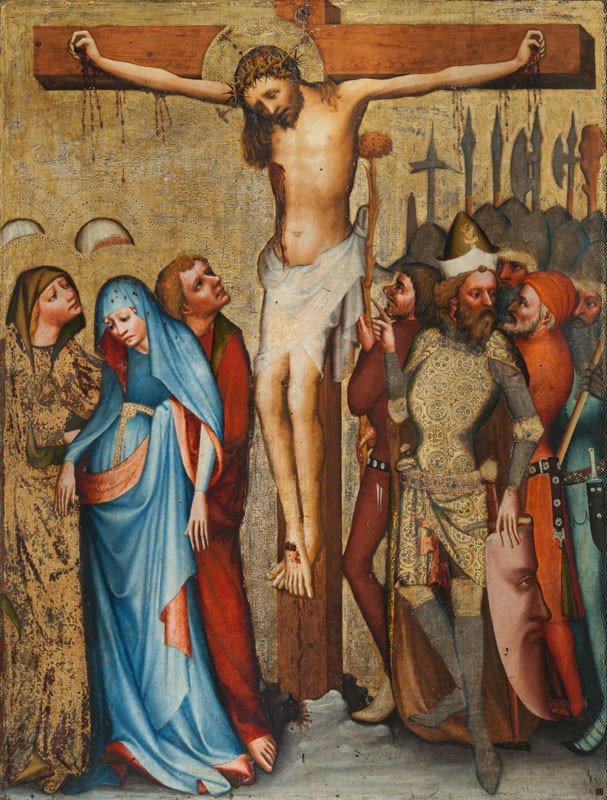
Crucifixion from the Chapel of St. Barbara, Master of the Třeboň Altarpiece - workshop (around 1385), National Gallery Prague

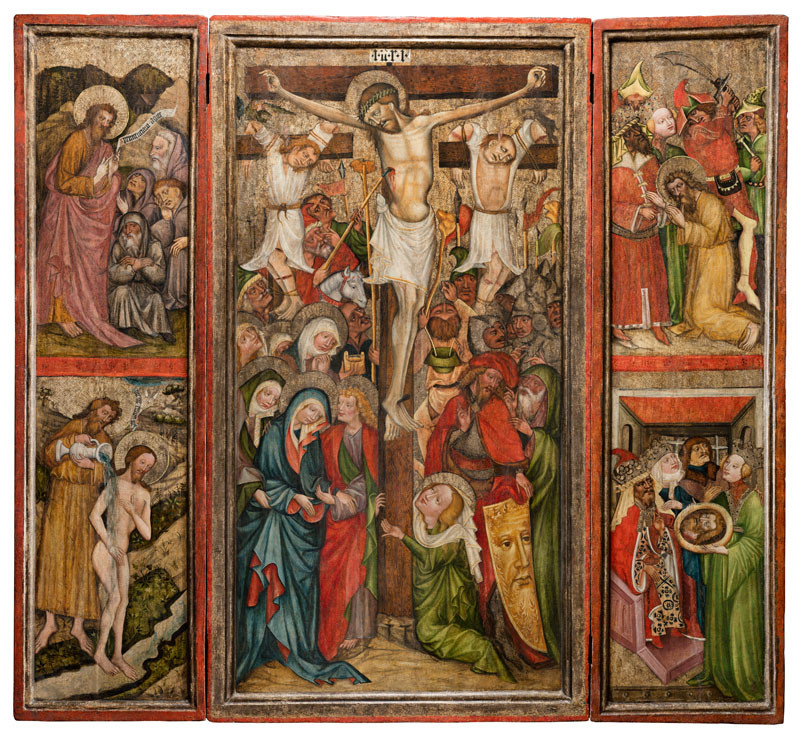
Altar from Zátoň, Anonym - Bohemia (after 1440), National Gallery Prague

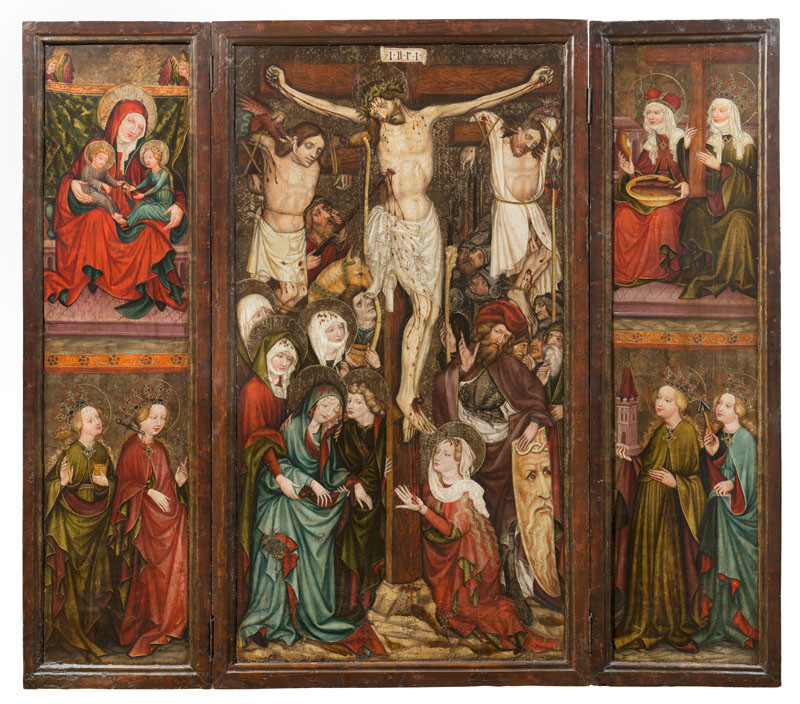
Reininghaus altar, Anonym - Bohemia (around 1440), National Gallery Prague

== Sources ==
- Fajt Jiří, Chlumská Štěpánka, Bohemia and Central Europe 1200-1550, National Gallery in Prague 2014, pp. 62-63 ISBN 978-80-7035-569-5
- Špinková Tereza, Rajhrad Altarpiece, Bachelor thesis, Catholic Theological Faculty of Charles University in Prague, 2008
- Bartlová Milena, Honest Images. Plate Painting in Bohemia and Moravia 1400-1460, Argo Prague 2001 ISBN 80-7203-365-4
- Bartlová, Milena. Czech panel painting 1400-1470 and the so-called Rajhrad Altar. [Bohemian Panel Painting 1400-1470 and the 'Rajhrad Altarpiece]. Brno, Masaryk University, Faculty of Philosophy, 2000
- Albert Kutal, Czech Gothic Art, Artia/Obelisk Prague 1972, p. 130
- Jaroslav Pešina, Panel Painting in: Czech Gothic Art 1350-1420, Academia Prague 1970, pp. 241-243
- Antonín Matějček, Jaroslav Pešina, Czech Gothic Painting, Melantrich, Prague 1950, pp.131-140
