= Dudik =

Dudik or Dudík may refer to:

- Dudik (war memorial), a World War II memorial park near Vukovar, Croatia
- Anton Dudik (born 2005), Ukrainian football player
- Artem Dudik (born 1997), Ukrainian football player
- Beda Dudík (1815–1890), Czech historian and monk
- Dmitri Dudik (born 1977), Belarusian ice hockey player
- Kimberly Dudik (born 1974), American politician
