= Master of the Rajhrad Altarpiece =

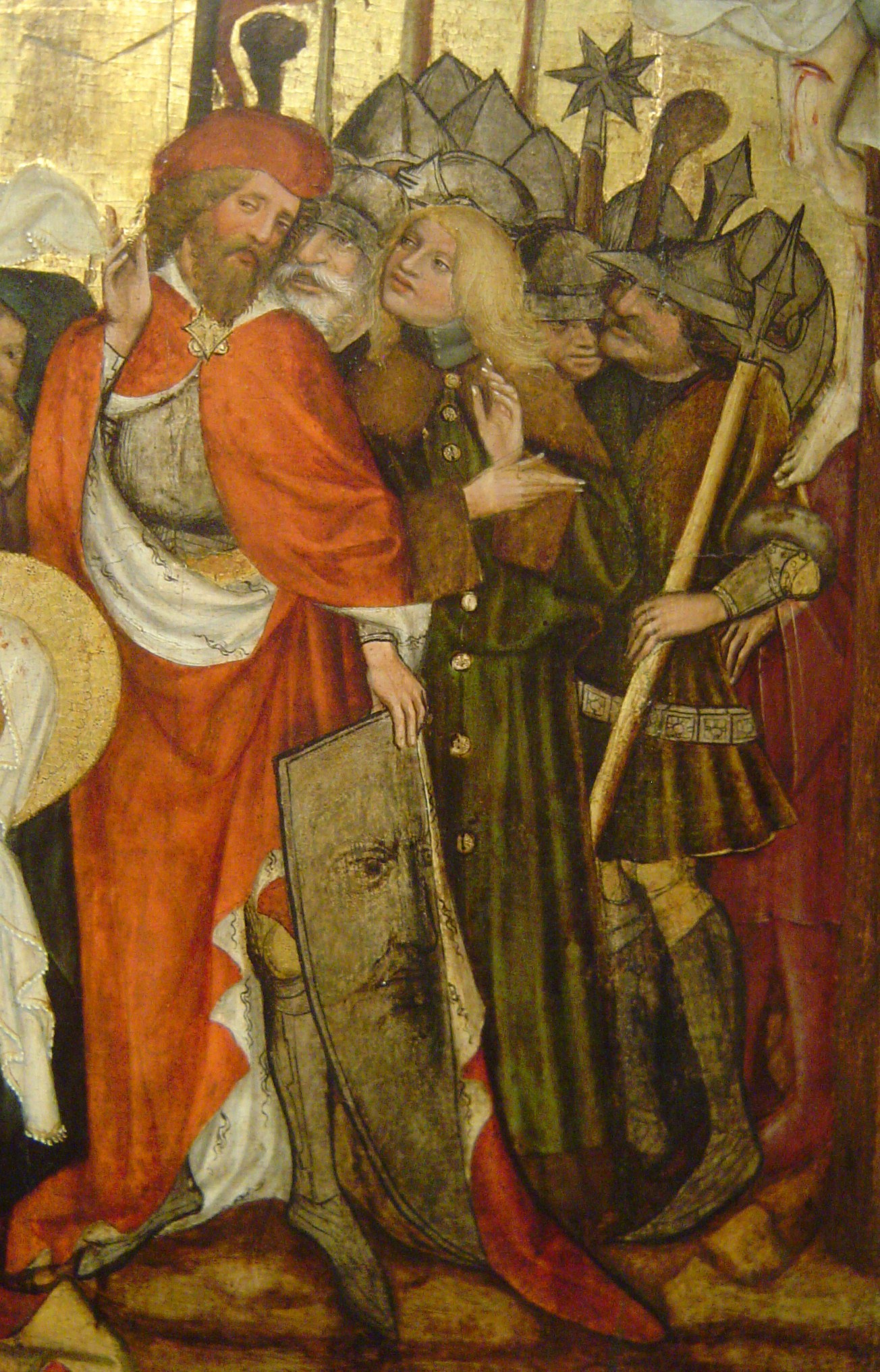
Detail from the Rajhrad Cruxifixion, part of the Rajhrad Altarpiece (c. 1430–40)

The Master of the Rajhrad Altarpiece (sometimes called the Master of Raigern) was a Bohemian painter active in the region around Olomouc and Brno before 1420. Likely of Moravian extraction, he derives his name from an altarpiece that once hung in the church of Saint Maurice in Olomouc; since disassembled, some of its panels are now in Rajhrad. These depict scenes from the Passion and from the Legend of the True Cross, and were painted before 1420. Two scenes, the Transportation of the Cross (Image) and the Crucifixion, are believed to be by his hand, while the rest are products of his studio. Also ascribed to him are the altarpiece of Náměšť, also dating to before 1420 and today found in Brno, and an Altarpiece of Saint Jacob of about 1430, today dispersed between Prague, Brno, Vienna and Nuremberg.

The Master influenced the work of artists even beyond Bohemia; work by the Master of the Saint Lambrecht Votive Altarpiece indicates that his style was known even in Vienna. Some historians conflate him with the Master of Ambrass, but not all agree with this assessment.

== Works attributed to the Master of the Rajhrad Altarpiece ==
- Rajhrad Altarpiece
  - Crucifixion from Nové Sady (National Gallery in Prague)
  - Last Supper (Moravian Gallery in Brno)
  - Christ on the Mount of Olives (Moravian Gallery in Brno)
  - Carrying of the Cross (Moravian Gallery in Brno)
  - Resurrection of Christ (Moravian Gallery in Brno)
  - The finding and testing of the true Holy Cross by St Helena and Constantine (Moravian Gallery in Brno)
- around 1425 (?) Double-sided painted panel from the castle in Náměšt' nad Oslavou with scenes of the Passion of St. Katherina, the Passion of St. Apolena (Moravian Gallery in Brno)
- around 1430-36 St. James Altar (Minorite Church of St. James in Prague or Church of St. James in Brno)
