= Josef Zelený =

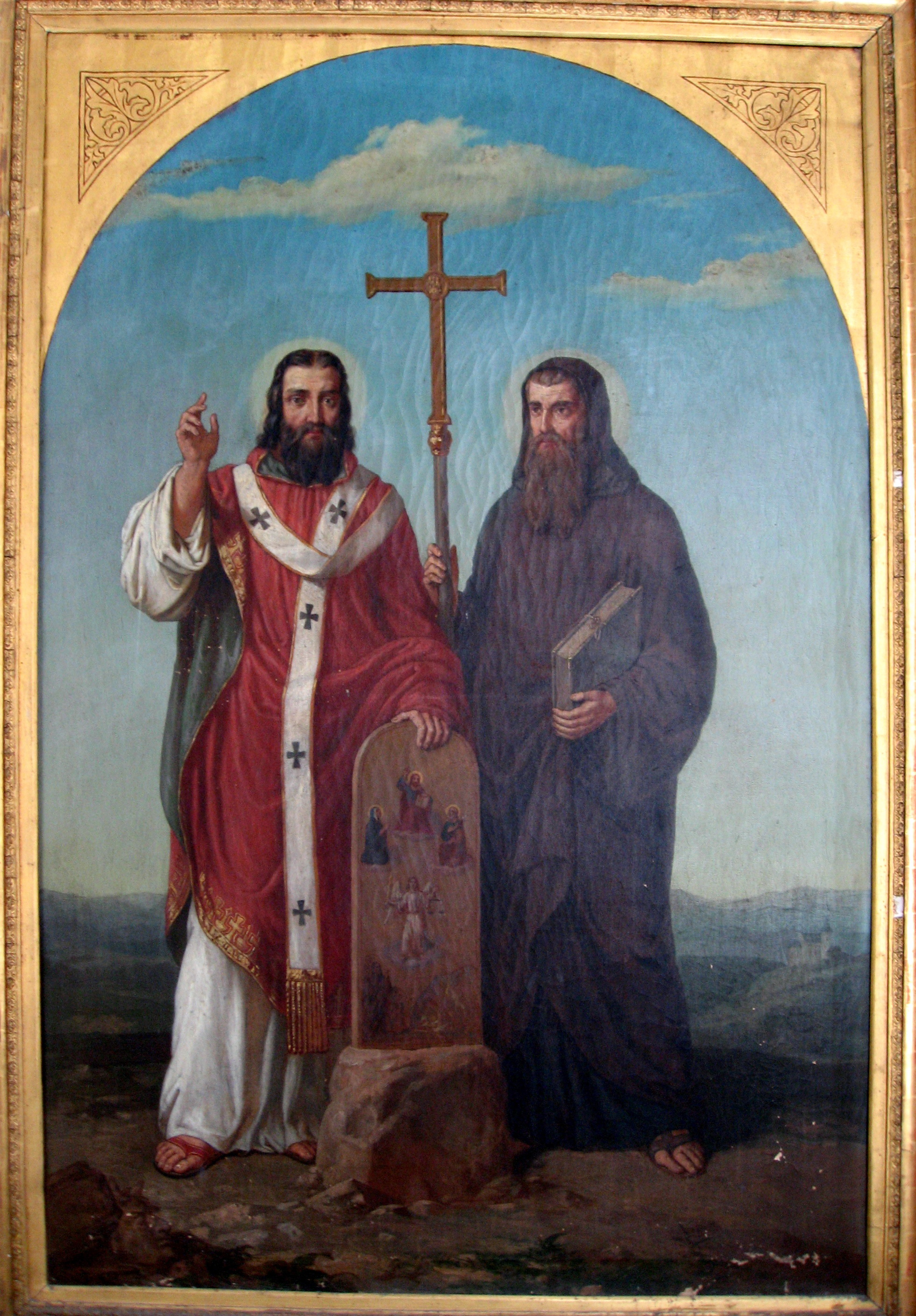
Svatý Cyril a Metoděj (1863)

Josef Zelený (24 March 1824 in Rajhrad – 3 May 1886 in Brno) was a Czech painter who was devoted to the formation of altarpieces, portraits and paintings of historical scenes, particular ones of a biblical nature.

He studied in Brno, Prague, Vienna and Paris.

== See also ==
- List of Czech painters
