= Beda Dudík =

Czech historian, science writer and Roman Catholic priest

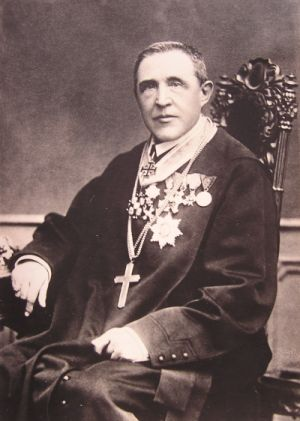
Beda Dudík

Beda František Dudík (29 January 1815, Kojetín – 18 January 1890, Rajhrad) was a historian and Benedictine monk in the Rajhrad Monastery.

== Life ==
After studying at the philosophical school at Brno he attended the University of Olomouc. In 1836 he entered the Benedictine Order and in 1840 was ordained priest at Rajhrad. Then until 1854 he taught first the classical languages and then history at the gymnasium of Brünn.

In 1855 he became Privatdozent for historical research at the University of Vienna; in 1859 he was appointed historiographer of Moravia, and in 1865 was made a member of the Academy of Sciences of Vienna. For purposes of historical research he went in 1851 to Sweden, in 1852 to Rome, in 1870 to France, Belgium, and Holland, in 1874 to Russia, a country which he later repeatedly visited.

Between the years 1853 and 1859 he established at Vienna the main historical library of the Teutonic Order.

== Works ==
Dudík was a prolific writer; his works have a lasting value on account of the sources from which he drew. His chief works in chronological order are:

- "Geschichte des Benediktinerstiftes Raigern" (2 vols., Brünn, 1849; 2nd ed., Vienna, 1868);
- "Mährens Geschichts-quellen" (Brünn, 1850);
- "Forschungen in Schweden für Mährens Geschichte" (Brünn, 1852);
- "Iter Romanum" (2 vols., Vienna, 1855);
- "Des Herzogtums Troppau ehemalige Stellung zur Markgrafschaft Mähren" (Vienna, 1857);
- "Waldsteins Korrespondenz" (Vienna, 1865–66);
- "Waldstein von seiner Enthebung bis zur abermaligen Übernahme des Armeekommandos" (Vienna, 1858);
- "Des hohen Deutschen Ritterordens Münzsammlung in Wien" (Vienna, 1858, a special edition with 32 copper plates);
- "Kleinodien des Deutschen Ritterordens" (Vienna, 1866);
- "Archive im Königreich Galizien und Lodomerien" (Vienna, 1867);
- "Erinnerungen aus dem Feldzug in Italien 1866" (Vienna, 1867);
- "Preussen in Mähren im Jahre 1742" (Vienna, 1869);
- "Schweden in Böhmen und Mähren 1640-1660" (Vienna, 1879);
- "Geschichtliche Entwickelung dor Buchdruckerkunst in Mähren von 1486 bis 1621" (Brünn, 1879).

Dudík's most important publication is: "Mährens allgemeine Geschichte" (12 vols., Brünn, 1860–89); it treats the history of Moravia up to 1350. Volumes VIII-X, which give an account of Moravia during the period of the Przemyslian dynasty, have been translated into Czech. He also published several papers in the transactions of the Academy of Sciences; in vol. LIV appeared: "Korrespondenz Ferdinands II. mit seinen Beichtvätern Becanus and Lamormain".
