= Master of the Gerona Martyrology =

The Master of the Gerona Martyrology was a Bohemian painter active at the end of the fourteenth century. His output is fairly poorly known; some historians have conflated him with either the Master of Ambrass or the Master of the Rajhrad Altarpiece. This view is not universally accepted, and a number of museums have work believed to be by members of his studio, including pieces of illuminated manuscripts.
