= Master of Ambrass =

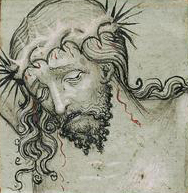
Head of the Crucified Christ, from the Wiener Musterbuch (Late 14th century). Silverpoint, ~ 2 cm^{2}. In the collection of the Vienna Museum of Art

The Master of Ambrass was a Bohemian painter active probably in Prague at the end of the fourteenth century. He was the creator of the Wiener Musterbuch, a set of silverpoint studies and subjects all dated to the same period, which were used as models in painters' studios. Among the subjects are bust-length images of Christ, the Virgin, various saints, the Crucifixion, and the Annunciation. The pictures are collected in groups of four, affixed to fourteen small framed panels. Three independent designs also exist, depicting a philosopher and astronomer, a sibyl and John the Evangelist, and the Three Magi; these, too, were probably part of the set. Such is the realism of the designs that it is believed the Master had contact with an artist of the Franco-Flemish school. Also attributed to his hand, dubiously, is an Annunciation at the Fogg Art Museum in Cambridge, Massachusetts.

Stylistically, the Master's work bears some similarities to that of the Master of the Pähl Altarpiece. He is sometimes conflated with both the Master of the Gerona Martyrology and the Master of the Rajhrad Altarpiece, but this attribution is not universally accepted.
