= Olomouc language island =

The Olomouc language island was a German-speaking area within the Czech-speaking area of central Moravia. It centered on the city of Olomouc, including the city centre, south and west suburbs and several villages on the south and the west. These areas also hosted Czech communities. The Olomouc language island ceased to exist after the expulsion of Germans from Czechoslovakia in 1945 and 1946.

== History ==
During the second half of the 19th century Olomouc was a German city with a significant Czech minority. German villages were near Olomouc (Neředín, Nová Ulice, Povel, Nové Sady, Nový Svět, Nemilany, Kyselov, Slavonín, Hněvotín and Nedvězí). During the time when Karl Brandhuber was the city's mayor, the Czech minority was culturally suppressed. After the end of the First World War the surrounding areas were merged with the Olomouc and relative harmony obtained between the two groups. After the Second World War, however, the German community from Olomouc and German villages were expelled.

== After expulsion ==
Former German inhabitants from Olomouc established a club, Heimatverband Olmütz und Mittelmähren in Nördlingen and made a connection among these people. The club publishes Olmützer Blätter magazine.

== Literature ==
- Bieberle, Josef: Olomoučtí Němci. K padesátému výročí jejich přesídlení. 1. Mezi dvěma světovými válkami. Střední Morava 3/1996, pp. 4–12.
- Bieberle, Josef: Olomoučtí Němci. K padesátému výročí jejich přesídlení. 2. Poválečný rozchod. Střední Morava 4/1997, pp. 4–22.
- Die Olmützer Sprachinsel (mit einer Karte). Wien 1919.
- Hájek, Martin: Odsun Němců z Olomouce. Vrahovice 2013. ISBN 978-80-260-4099-6.
- Hájek, Martin: Odsun Němců z Olomouce. 2nd Edition. Vrahovice 2022. ISBN 978-80-11-01912-9.
- Hájek, Martin: Olomoučtí Němci 1918–1938. Olomouc 2020. ISBN 978-80-244-5726-0.
- Kux, Johann: Die deutschen Siedlungen um Olmütz: ein volksbodengeschichtliches Quellenwerk bis 1918, mit 47 Bildtafeln, 10 Karten und 8 Tabellen Besitzerreihen. Olmütz 1943.
- Kux, Johann: Geschichte der königlichen Hauptstadt Olmütz bis zum Umsturz 1918. Reichenberg 1937.
- Mezihorák, František: Olomoučtí Němci po druhé světové válce: Svaz domoviny Olomouce a střední Moravy = Olmützer Deutsche nach dem zweiten Weltkrieg: (Heimatverband Olmütz und Mittelmähren). Olomouc 2008. ISBN 978-80-7182-251-6.
- Motyčka, Lukáš – Opletalová, Veronika (eds.): Literární procházky německou Olomoucí = Literarische Wanderungen durch das deutsche Olmütz. Olomouc 2012. ISBN 978-80-244-3025-6.
- Puš, Ivan: Olomoučtí Němci v letech 1880–1918. Olomouc 2018. (PhD thesis written at the Palacký University)
- Šebestová, Pavlína: Die Olmützer Sprachinsel - Gedächtnis des Ortes und konkrete Schicksale der damaligen deutschen Bewohner. Ostrava 2010. (Bachelor's thesis written at the University of Ostrava)
