= Rajhrad =

- Town
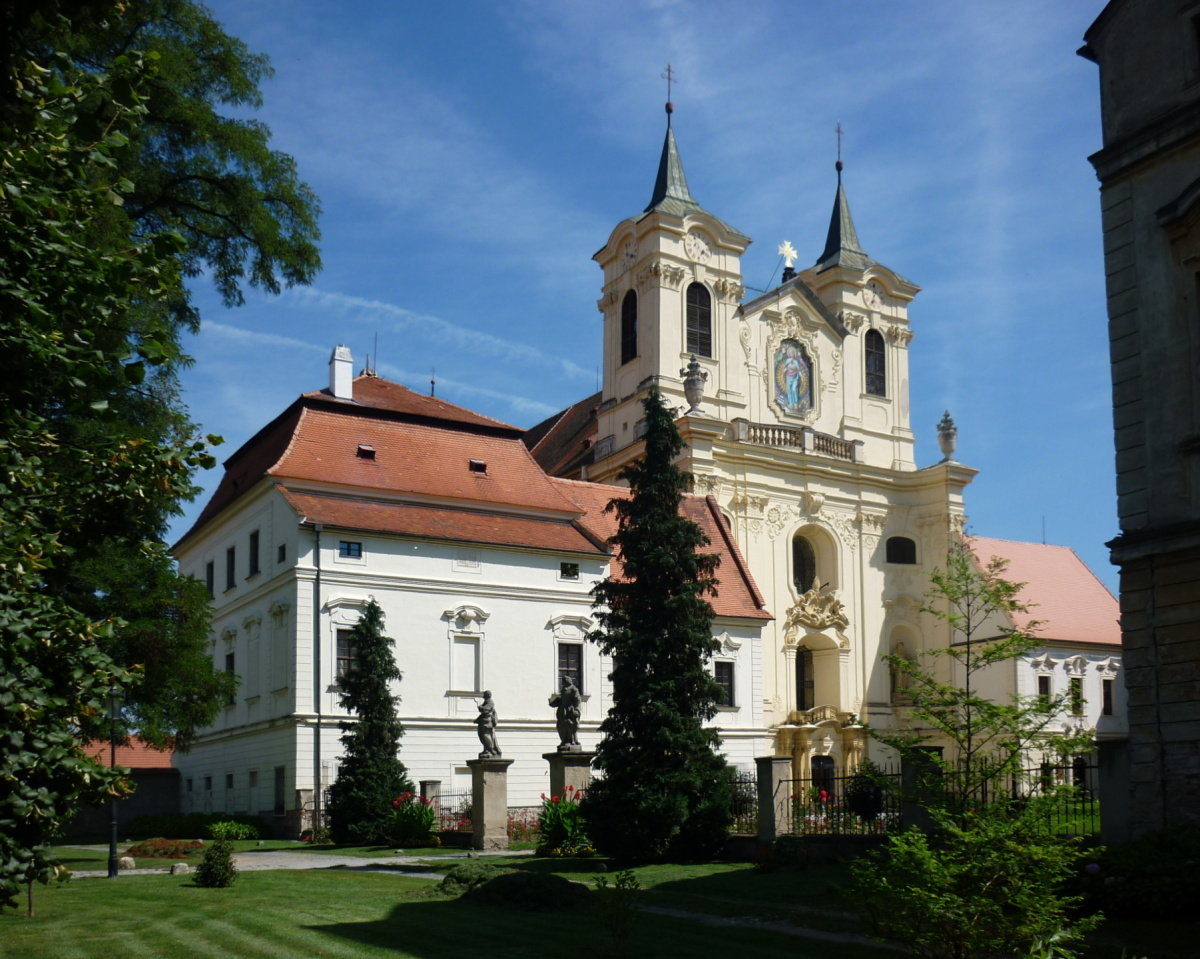
- Benedictine monastery

- Flag Coat of arms

- Location in the Czech Republic
- Coordinates: 49°5′25″N 16°36′14″E
- Country: Czech Republic
- Region: South Moravian
- District: Brno-Country
- First mentioned: 1169

Government
  - Mayor: František Ondráček

Area
  - Total: 9.49 km^{2} (3.66 sq mi)
- Elevation: 190 m (620 ft)

Population (2026-01-01)
  - Total: 4,113
  - Density: 433/km^{2} (1,120/sq mi)
- Time zone: UTC+1 (CET)
  - Summer (DST): UTC+2 (CEST)
- Postal code: 664 61
- Website: www.rajhrad.cz

Rajhrad (Czech pronunciation: [ˈrajɦrat]; German: Groß Raigern) is a town in Brno-Country District in the South Moravian Region of the Czech Republic. It has about 4,100 inhabitants. The town is located on the Svratka River in the Dyje–Svratka Valley. Rajhrad is known for the Rajhrad Abbey, one of the oldest monasteries in Moravia.

== Geography ==
Rajhrad is located about 10 kilometres (6 mi) south of Brno. It lies in the Dyje–Svratka Valley. The town is situated on the right bank of the Svratka River.

== History ==
The first written mention of Rajhrad is from 1169. It was probably founded at the turn of 10th and 11th centuries and named after a nearby former gord. The Benedictine monastery was founded here in the mid-11th century. In 1234, Rajhrad was allowed to hold a market, and in 1330, it was called a market village. In 1339, it was first referred to as a market town.

In 2000, Rajhrad became a town.

== Demographics ==
Historical population

Year	Pop.	±%
1869	1,496	—
1880	1,651	+10.4%
1890	1,522	−7.8%
1900	1,629	+7.0%
1910	1,874	+15.0%

Year	Pop.	±%
1921	1,987	+6.0%
1930	2,400	+20.8%
1950	2,376	−1.0%
1961	2,597	+9.3%
1970	2,716	+4.6%

Year	Pop.	±%
1980	3,058	+12.6%
1991	2,763	−9.6%
2001	2,713	−1.8%
2011	3,277	+20.8%
2021	4,181	+27.6%

Source: Censuses

== Transport ==
The D52 motorway (part of the European route E461) from Brno to Pohořelice runs next to the town.

== Sights ==
The main landmark of Rajhrad is the Rajhrad Abbey. It is one of the oldest and most valuable monasteries in Moravia. It includes the abbey Church of Saints Peter and Paul, which was built during the Baroque reconstruction of the monastery. It was designed by the architect Jan Santini Aichel. Today the monastery houses the Monument of Literature in Moravia with a historical library.

== Notable people ==
- Beda Dudík (1815–1890), historian; lived and died here
- Josef Zelený (1824–1886), painter
