= Rajhrad Abbey =

Coordinates: 49°21′11″N 16°24′03″E

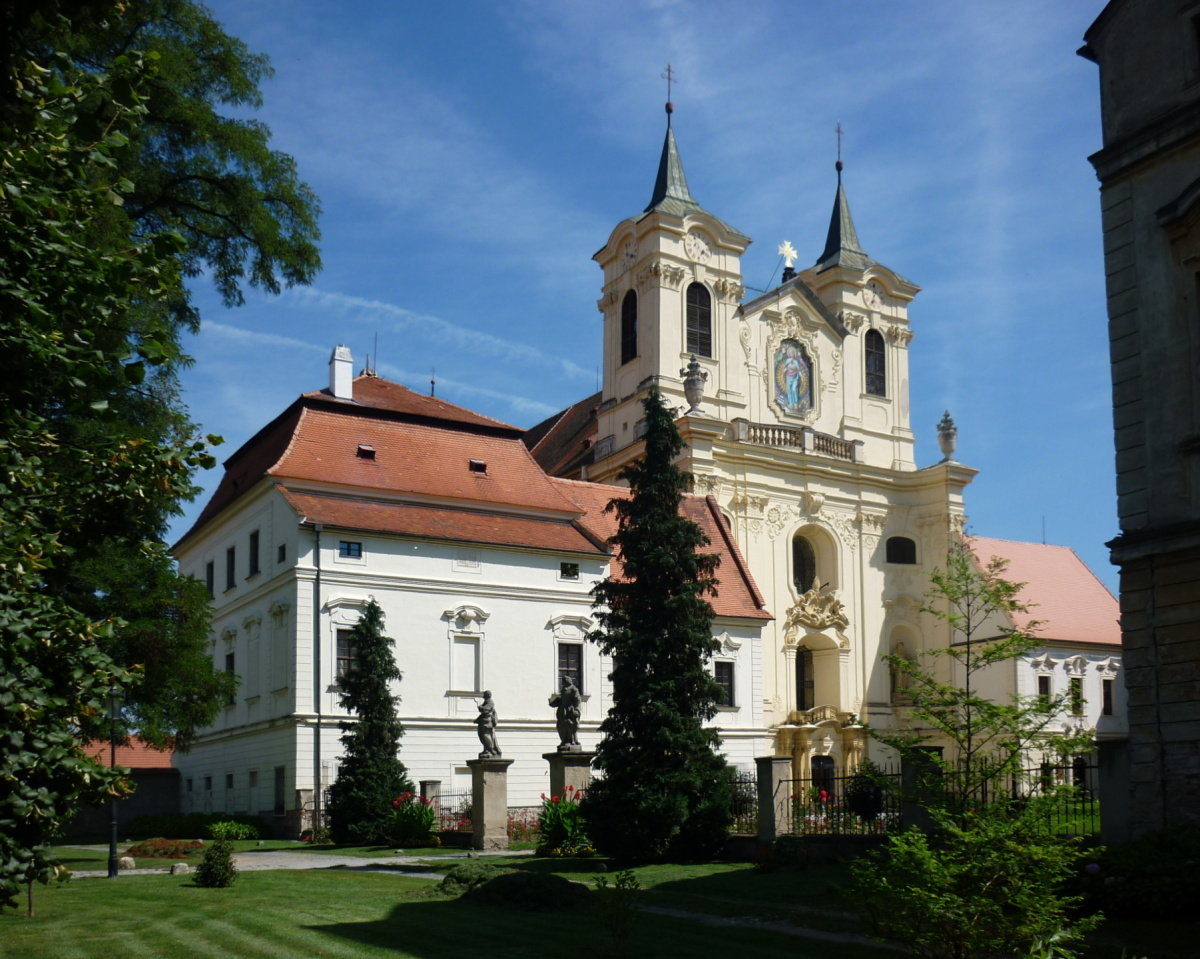
Western portal of the convent church

Rajhrad Abbey (Czech: Rajhradské opatství; German: Abtei Raigern) is a Benedictine abbey in Rajhrad in the South Moravian Region, Czech Republic. It was founded by Duke Bretislav I in 1045. It was the first Benedictine male monastery in the country and first historically mentioned monastery in Moravia.

== Location ==
The abbey is located in Rajhrad in the South Moravian Region, about 10 kilometres (6 mi) south of Brno. It lies in the Dyje–Svratka Valley and is situated on the left bank of the Svratka River. The town of Rajhrad grew around the monastery.

The Museum of Literature in Moravia with a rich and valuable library is located in the monastery buildings.

== History ==
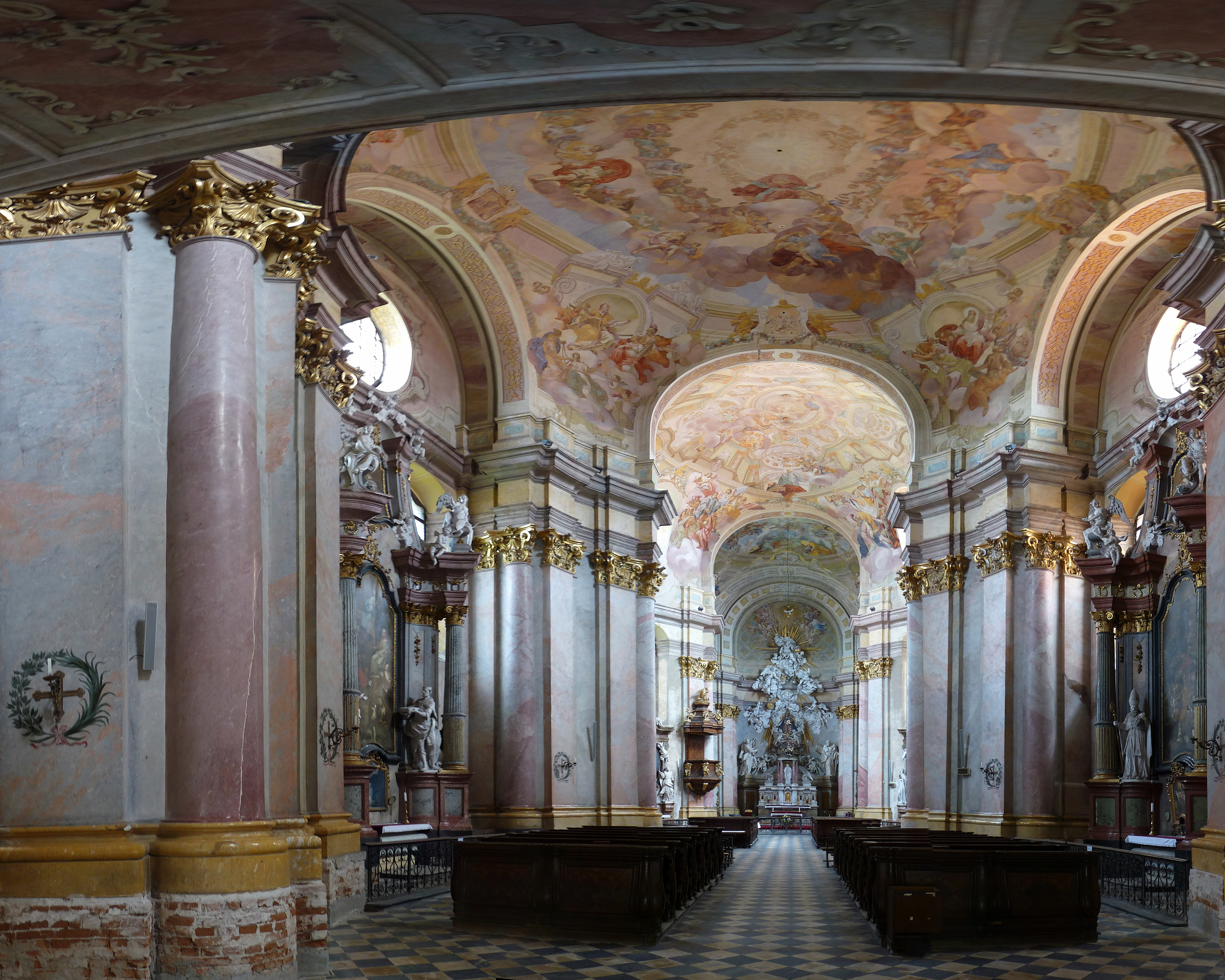
Chapter house

The monastery was founded in 1045 by Moravian and later Bohemian Duke Bretislav I. Originally was established filial monastery of Břevnov Abbey in Prague, in fact as a chapter type of community. The monastery was founded in the place of an ancient settlement and in the neighborhood of the Great Moravian gord. In these contexts, the possibility of an older monastic (monk) tradition from the time of Great Moravia, i.e. almost 200 years older, is occasionally discussed. But clear evidence has not yet been found.

The first Romanesque buildings were built with some delay from the beginning. The monastery owned several villages and other properties. It was looted several times in the Middle Ages and was restored again. In the 18th century, during the powerful renewal of the Catholic confession, the monastery was in good condition and was generously rebuilt in the Baroque style. In particular, the convent church, designed by architect Jan Santini Aichel, is an excellent example of European Baroque architecture.

The foundation stone of today's monastery church of St. Peter and Paul was laid on 4 July 1722. Construction took 17 years. The temple was re-consecrated on 7 June 1739 by the Prince-Bishop Jakob Ernst von Liechtenstein-Kastelkorn.

== Architecture ==
The nave is elongated, as it responds to the older medieval layout. It has a traditional orientation (west-east) and is divided into three semi-autonomous halls, spatially and optically continuous. each of the halls has its own vault system and geometry. Vaults and walls are covered with Baroque frescoes by the painter Johann Georg Etgens of Brno.

== Gallery ==
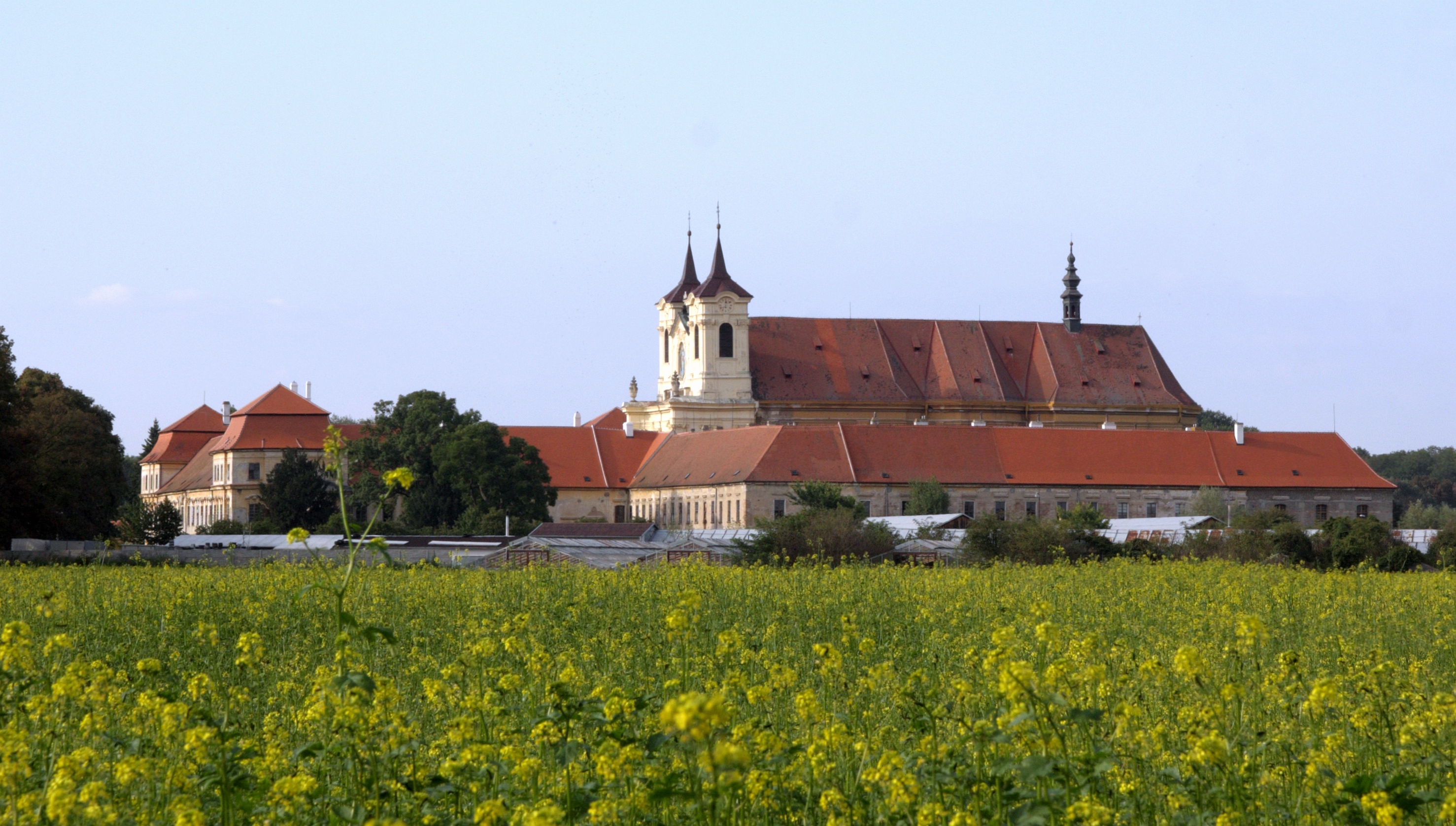
View from the south

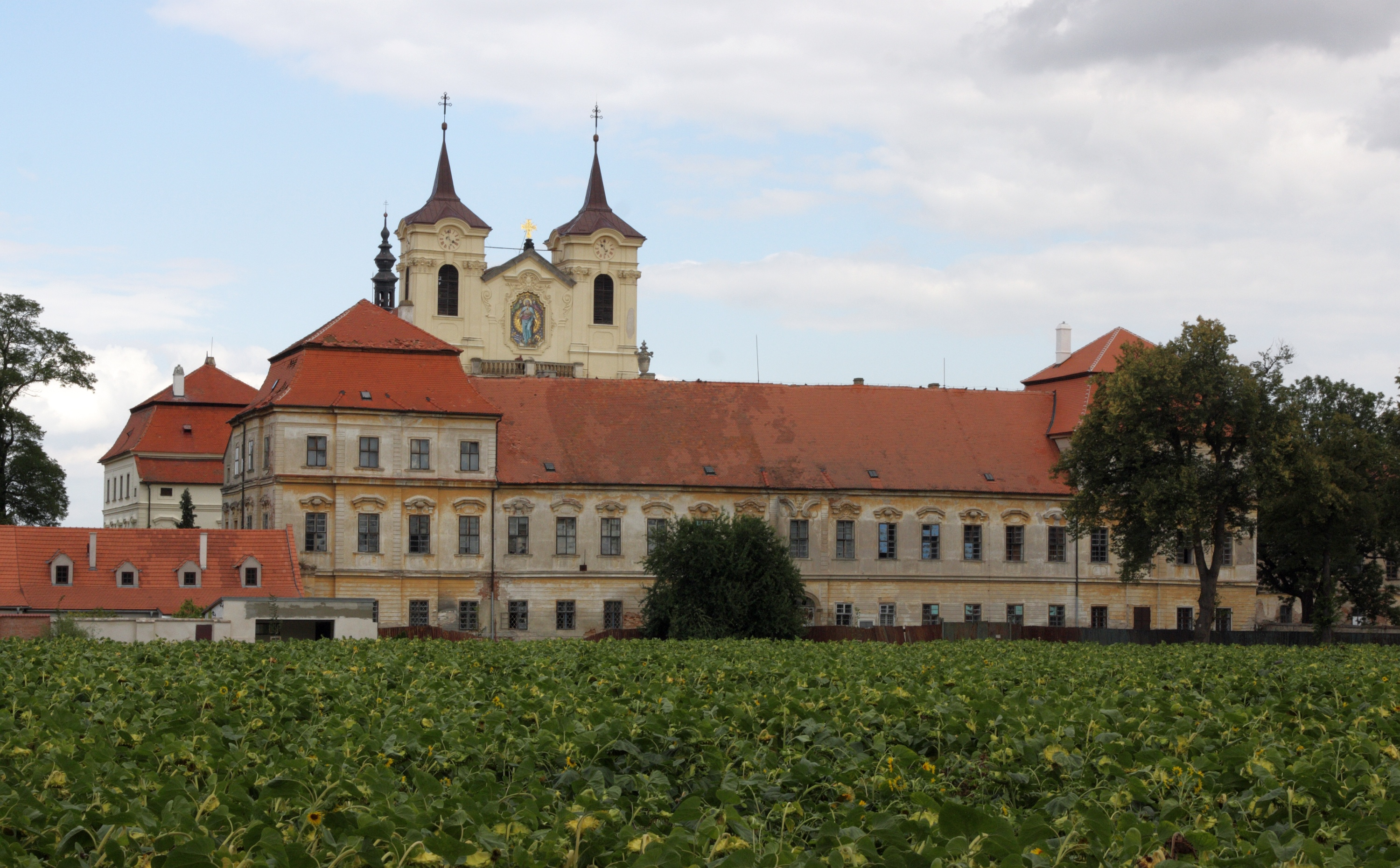
Western wing

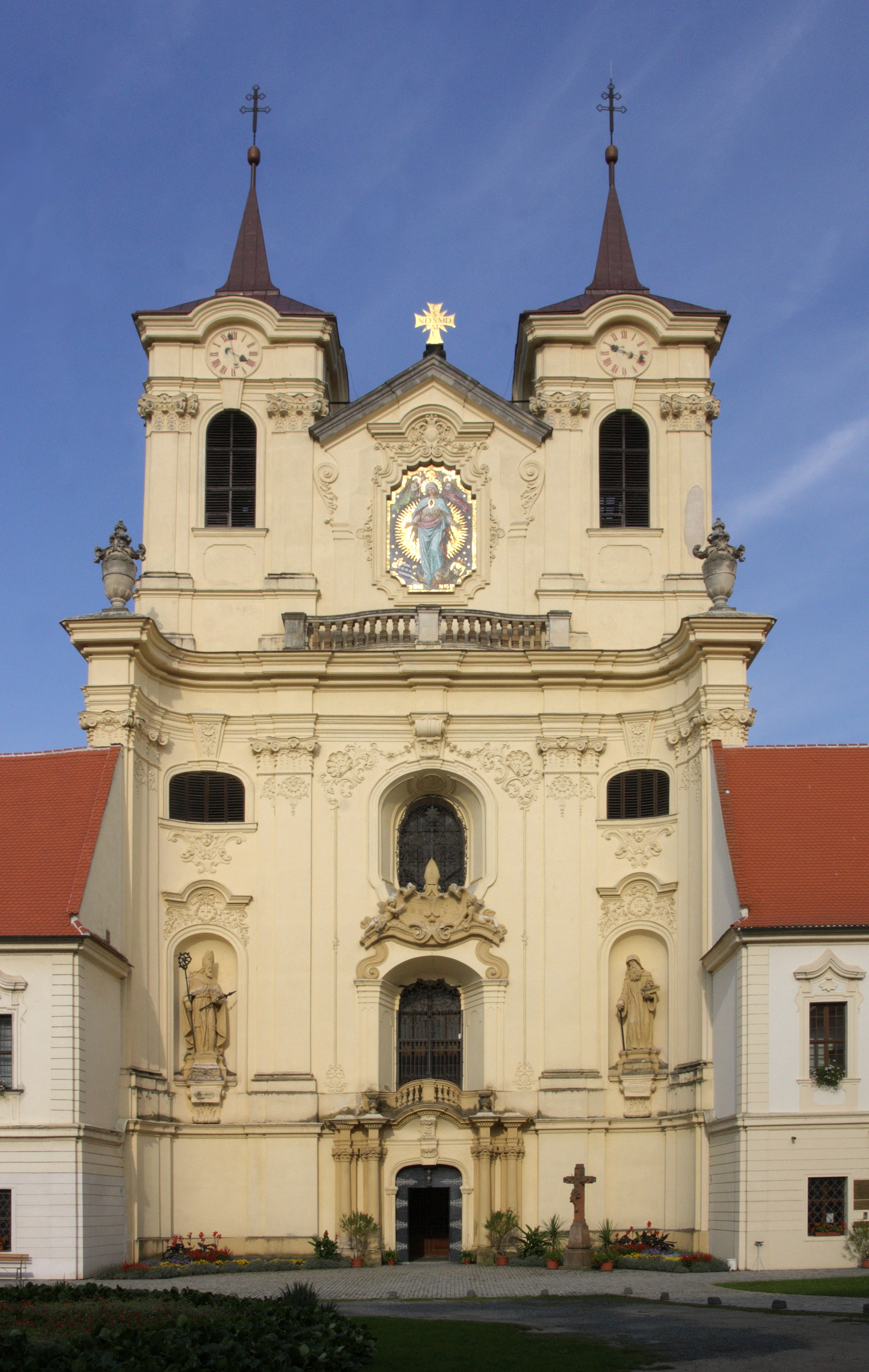
Front view of the church

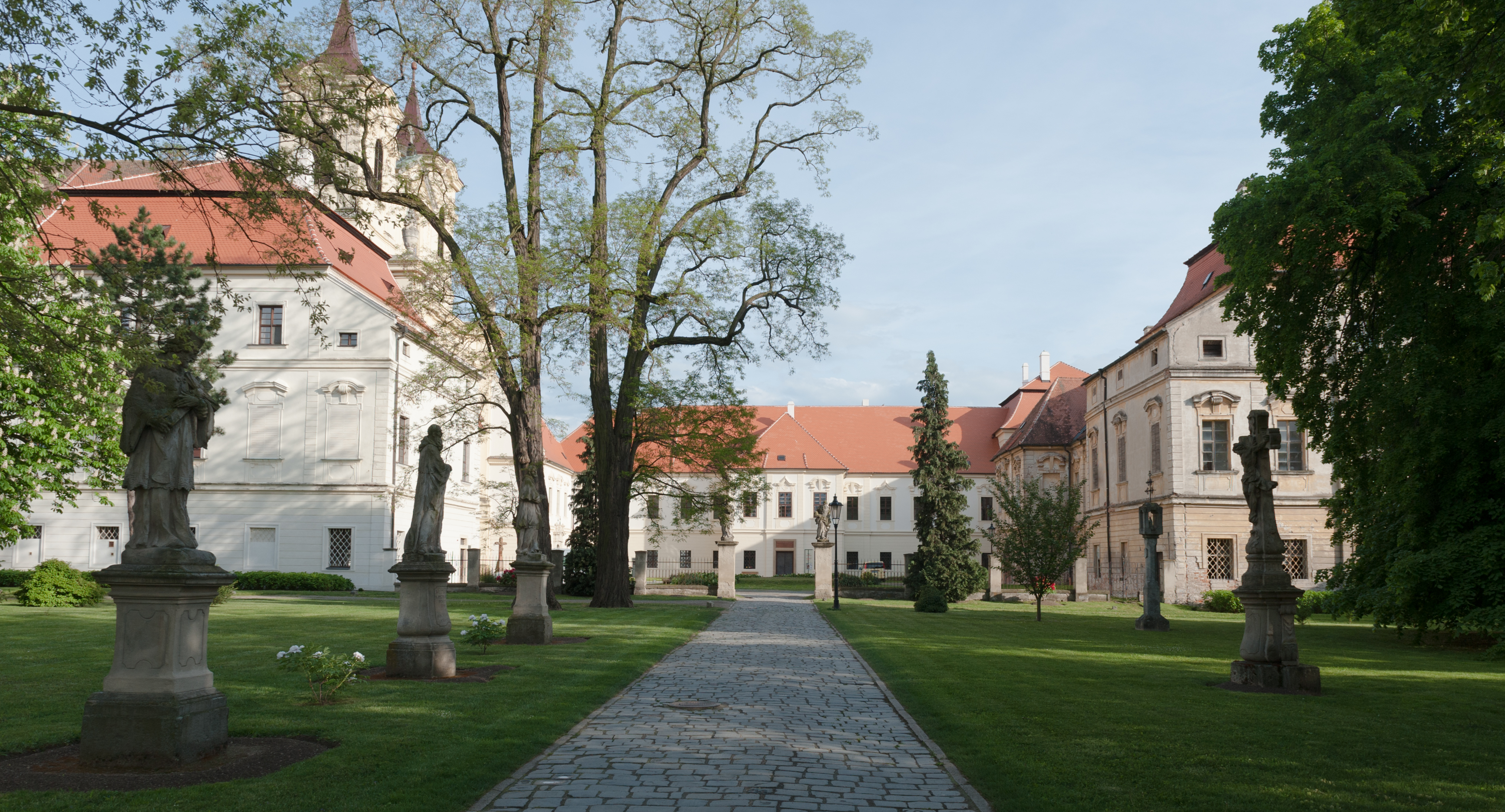
Exhibition showing history of the monastery

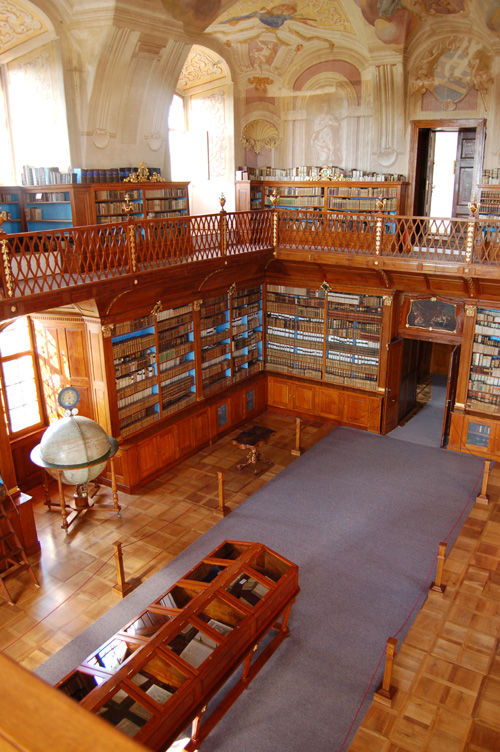
Library

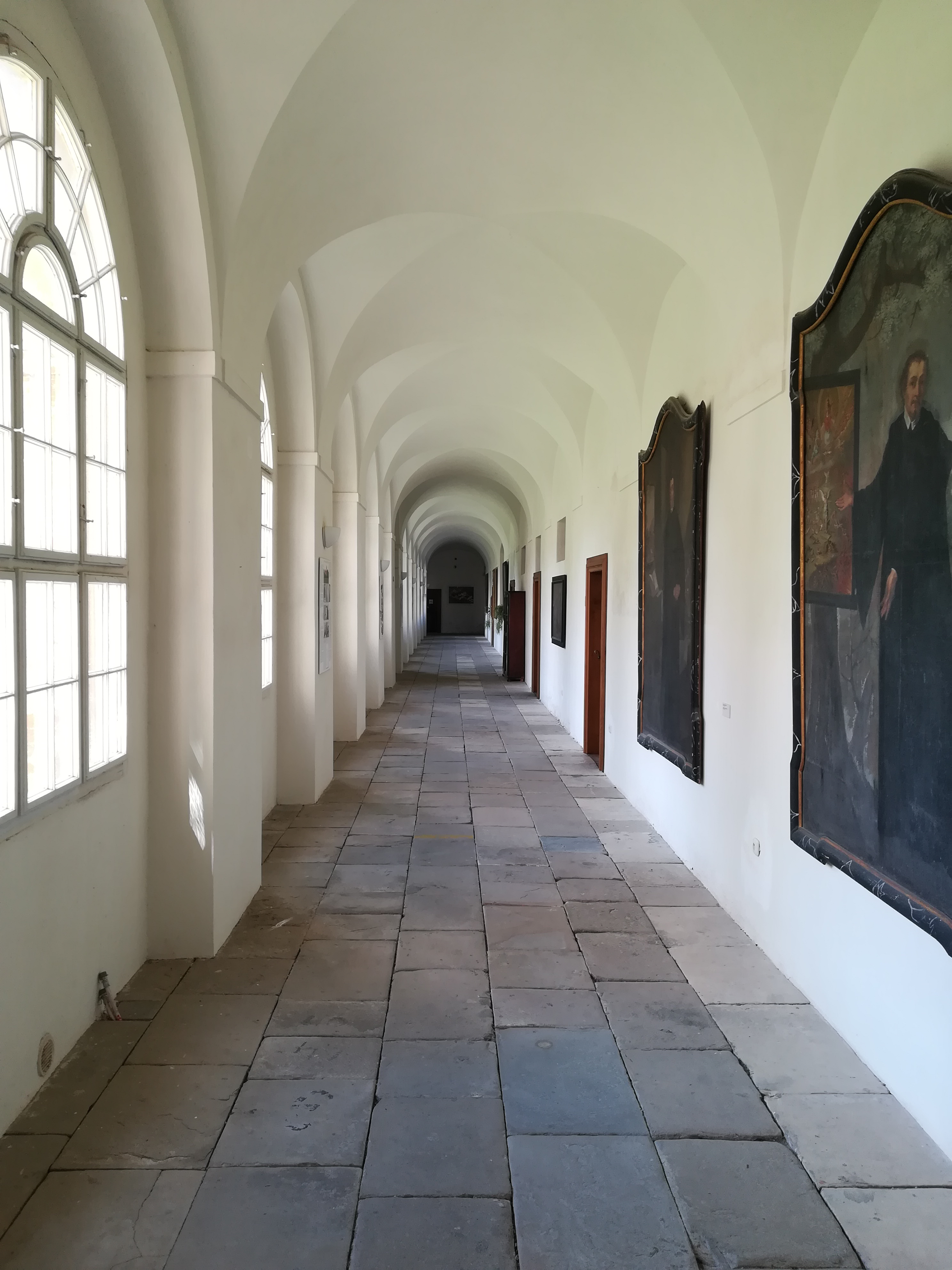
Cloister

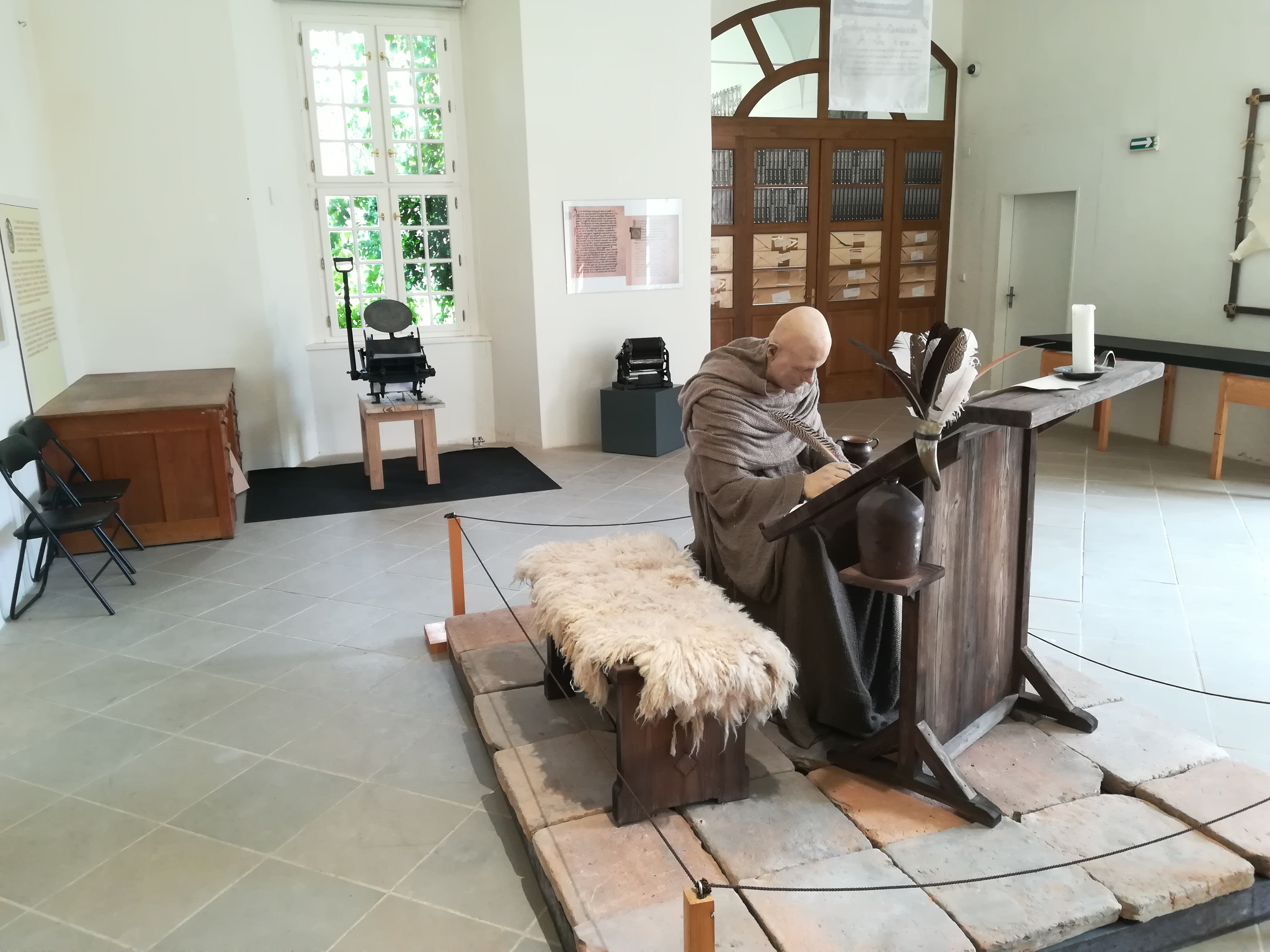
Museum of Literature in Moravia

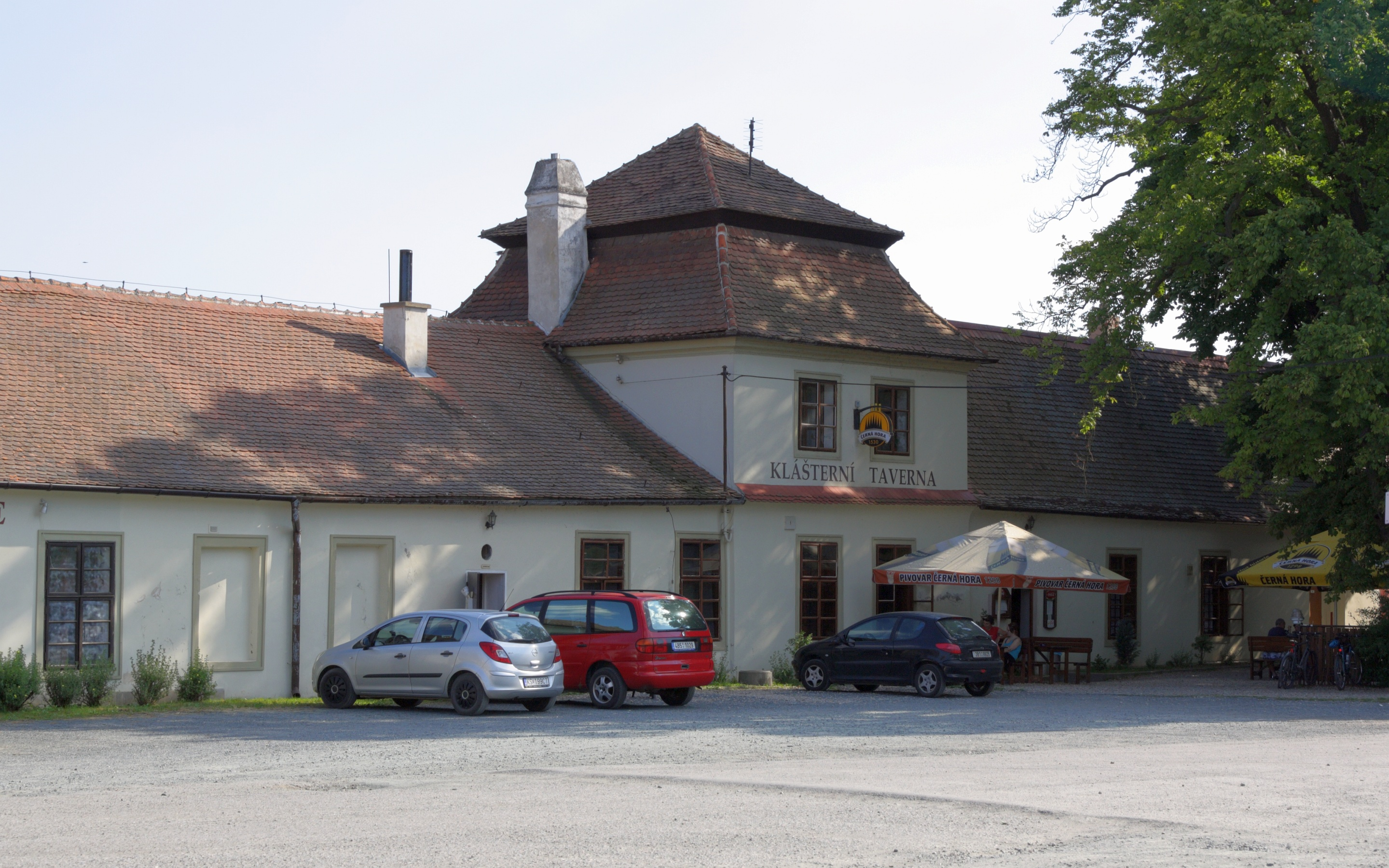
Monastery inn

== See also ==
- Master of the Rajhrad Altarpiece
