= Moravian Gallery in Brno =

Art museum in Brno

- Moravská galerie v Brně
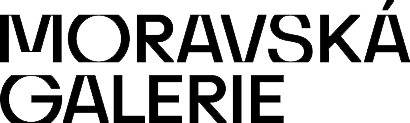

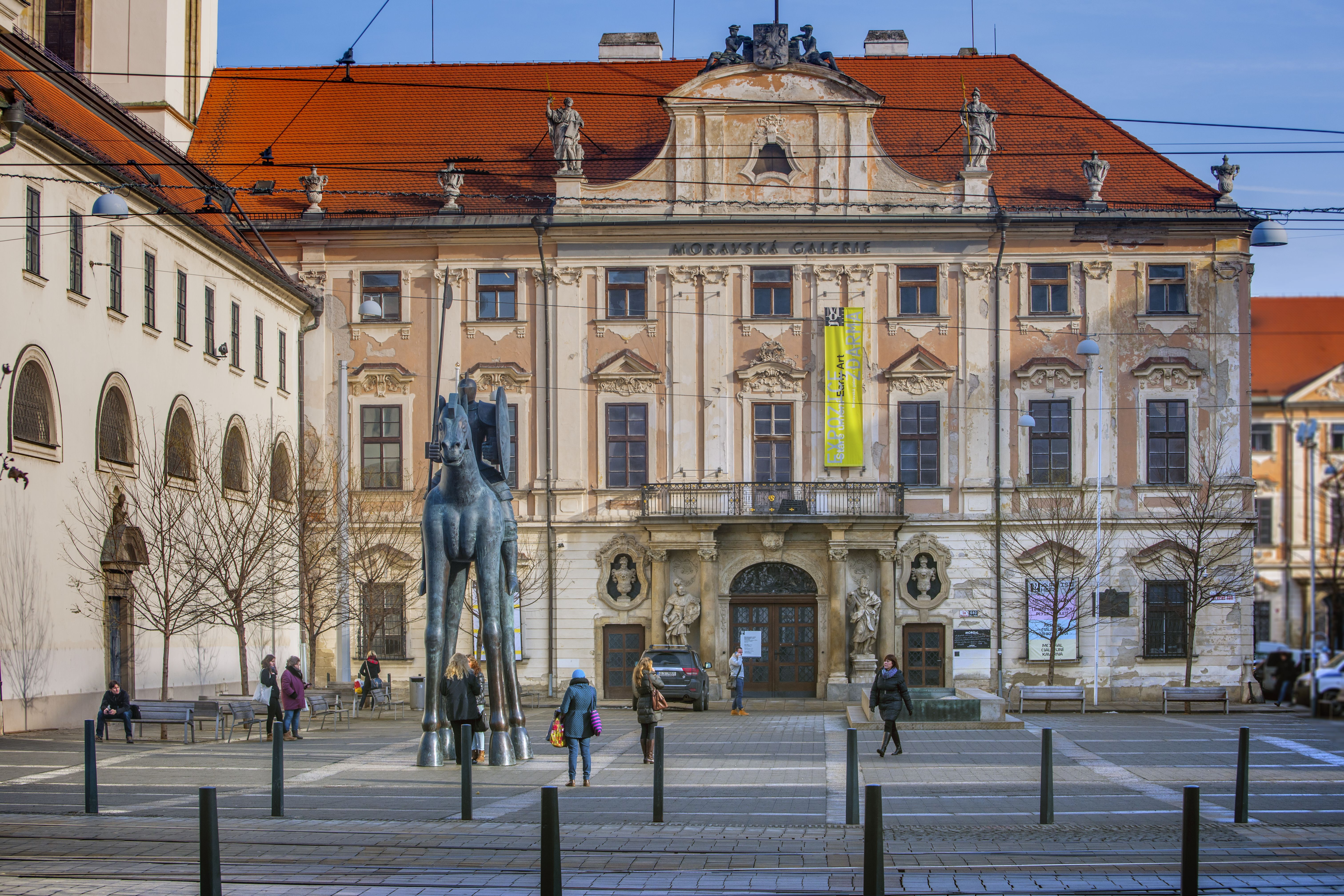
- Governor's Palace
- Interactive fullscreen map
- Established: 1961; 65 years ago
- Location: Husova 18, Brno, Czech Republic, 662 26
- Coordinates: 49°11′44″N 16°36′16″E
- Website: https://moravska-galerie.cz/?lang=en

The Moravian Gallery in Brno (Czech: Moravská galerie v Brně) is the second largest art museum in the Czech Republic, established in 1961 by the merging of two older institutions. It is in five buildings: Pražák Palace, Governor's Palace, Museum of Applied Arts, Jurkovič House and Josef Hoffmann Museum. Since 1963 the gallery has organized the International Biennial of Graphic Design Brno (Czech: Mezinárodní bienále grafického designu Brno).

== Selected collection highlights ==
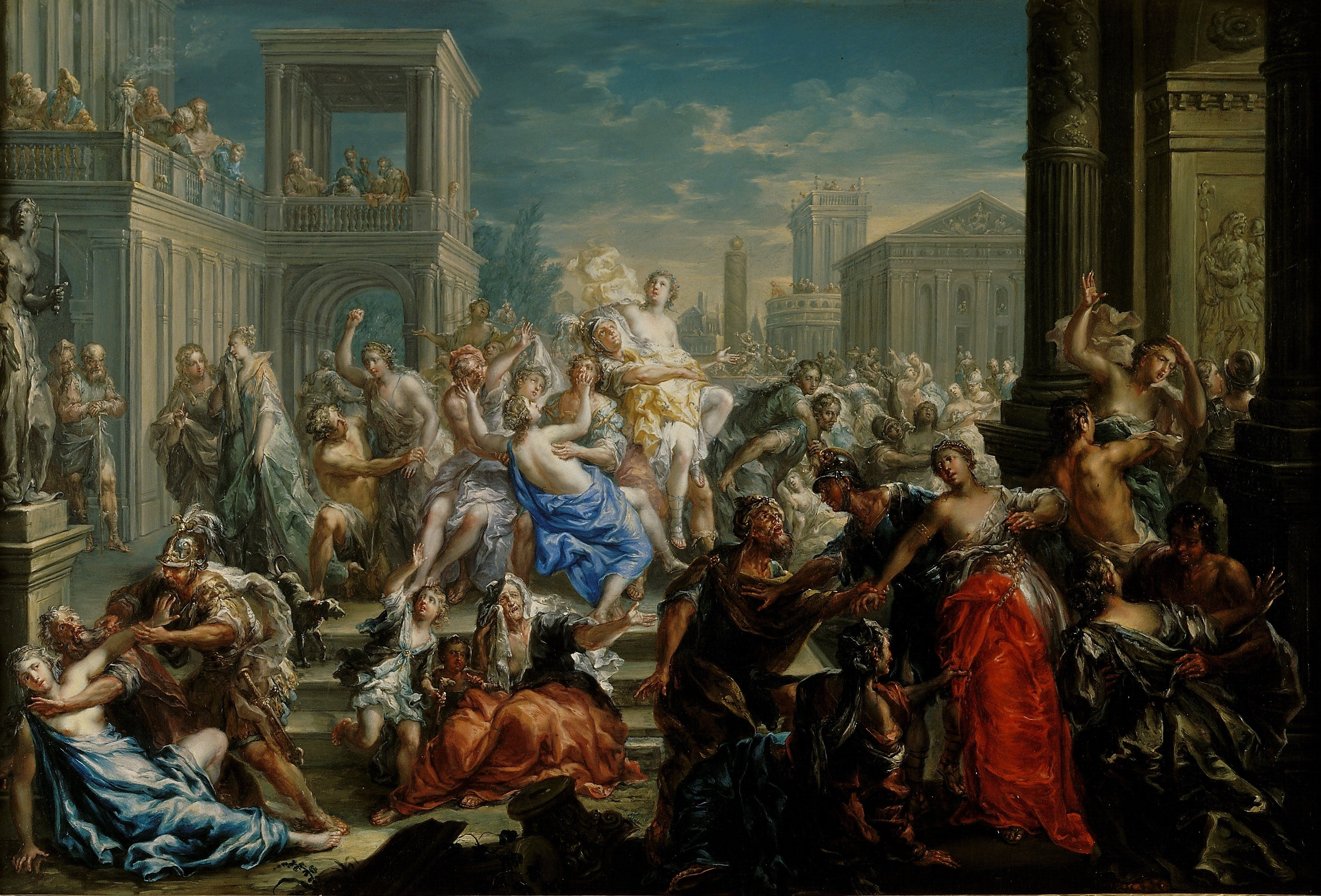
Johann Georg Platzer

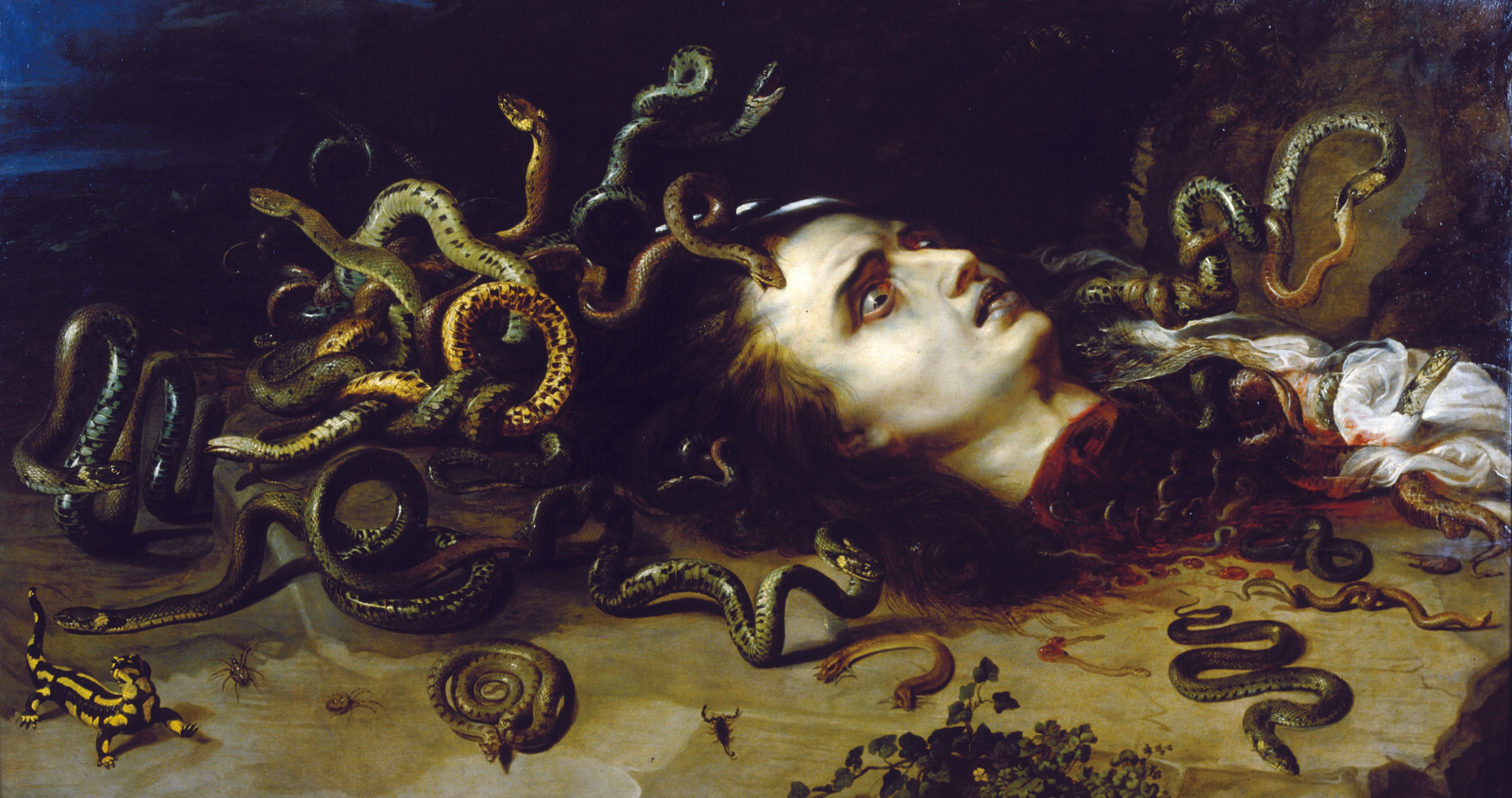
Peter Paul Rubens

== Pražák Palace ==
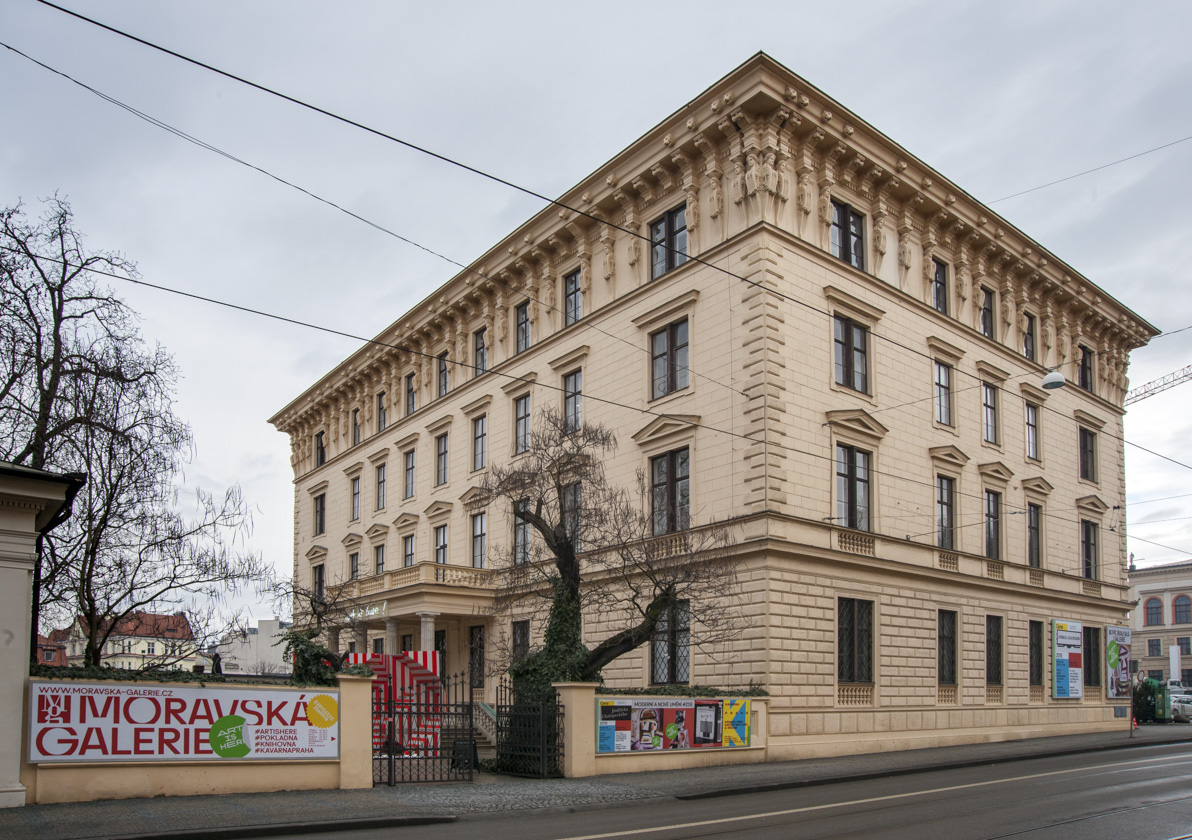
Pražák Palace

The Pražák Palace contains the headquarters of the Moravian Gallery in Brno. The building was designed by Theophil von Hansen and built for the Brno politician Alois Pražák in 1873–1874. It houses both permanent and temporary exhibitions, as well as a specialist library and study room, open to the public since 1883.

== Governor's Palace ==
An Augustinian monastery was built on this site in the mid-14th century, but was substantially rebuilt in a Baroque style by Moritz Grimm in the mid-18th century. Following reforms introduced by Emperor Joseph II, the building was converted into central offices for the local government and Governor's Estates authorities, and was used in this way until World War I. The Governor's Palace now houses a permanent exhibition of art from the Gothic period to the 19th century, and a 150-seat baroque hall.

== Museum of Applied Arts ==
This building was purpose-built in 1882 to house the oldest museum of applied arts in Bohemia and Moravia, and extended six years later. After World War II the building was reconstructed according to plans by the functionalist architect Bohuslav Fuchs. A restoration project was completed in 2001.

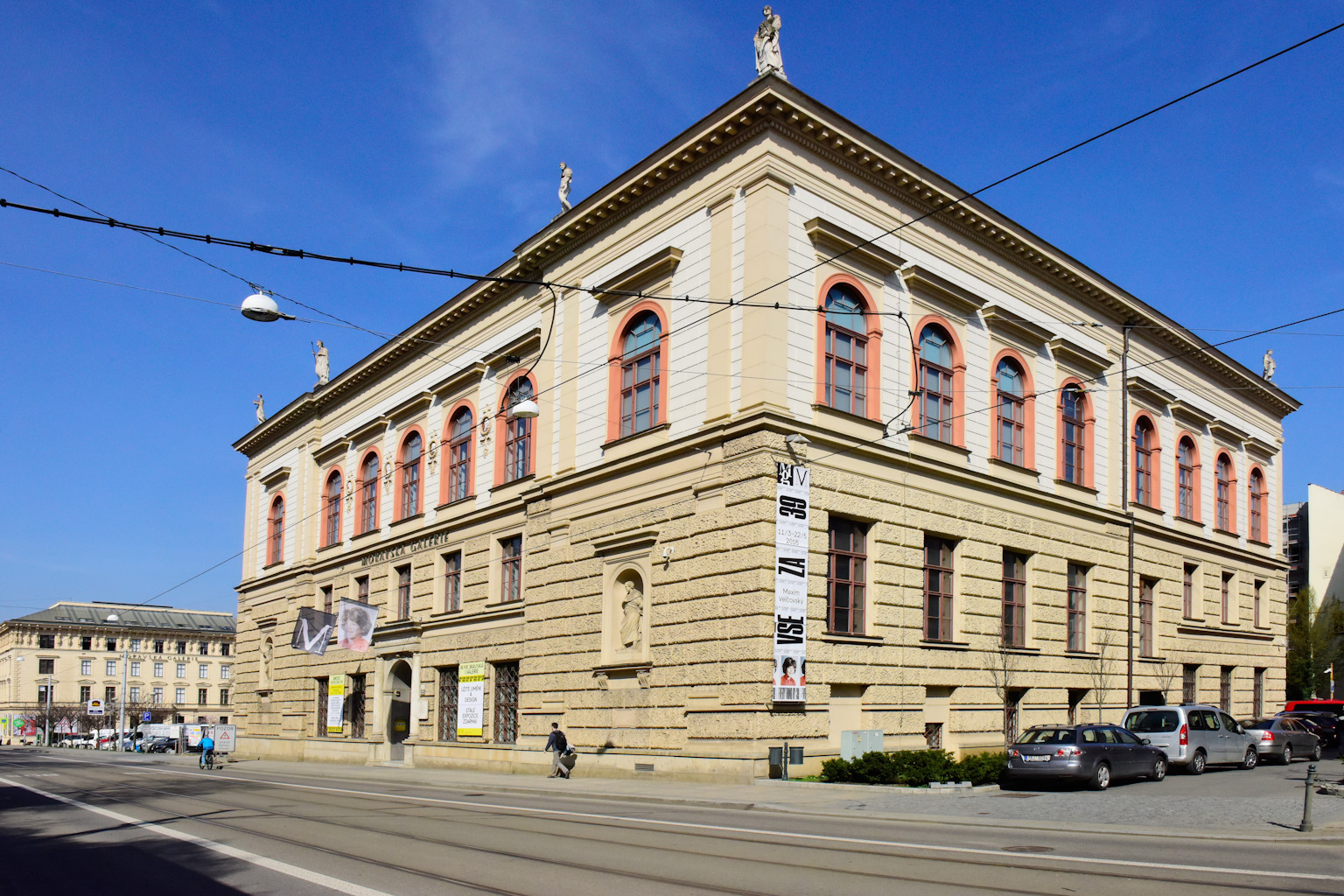
Museum of Applied Arts

The museum houses a permanent exhibition of applied arts from the Middle Ages to the present day, including collections of glass, ceramics and porcelain, textiles, furniture and metalware, as well as a 70-seat lecture room.

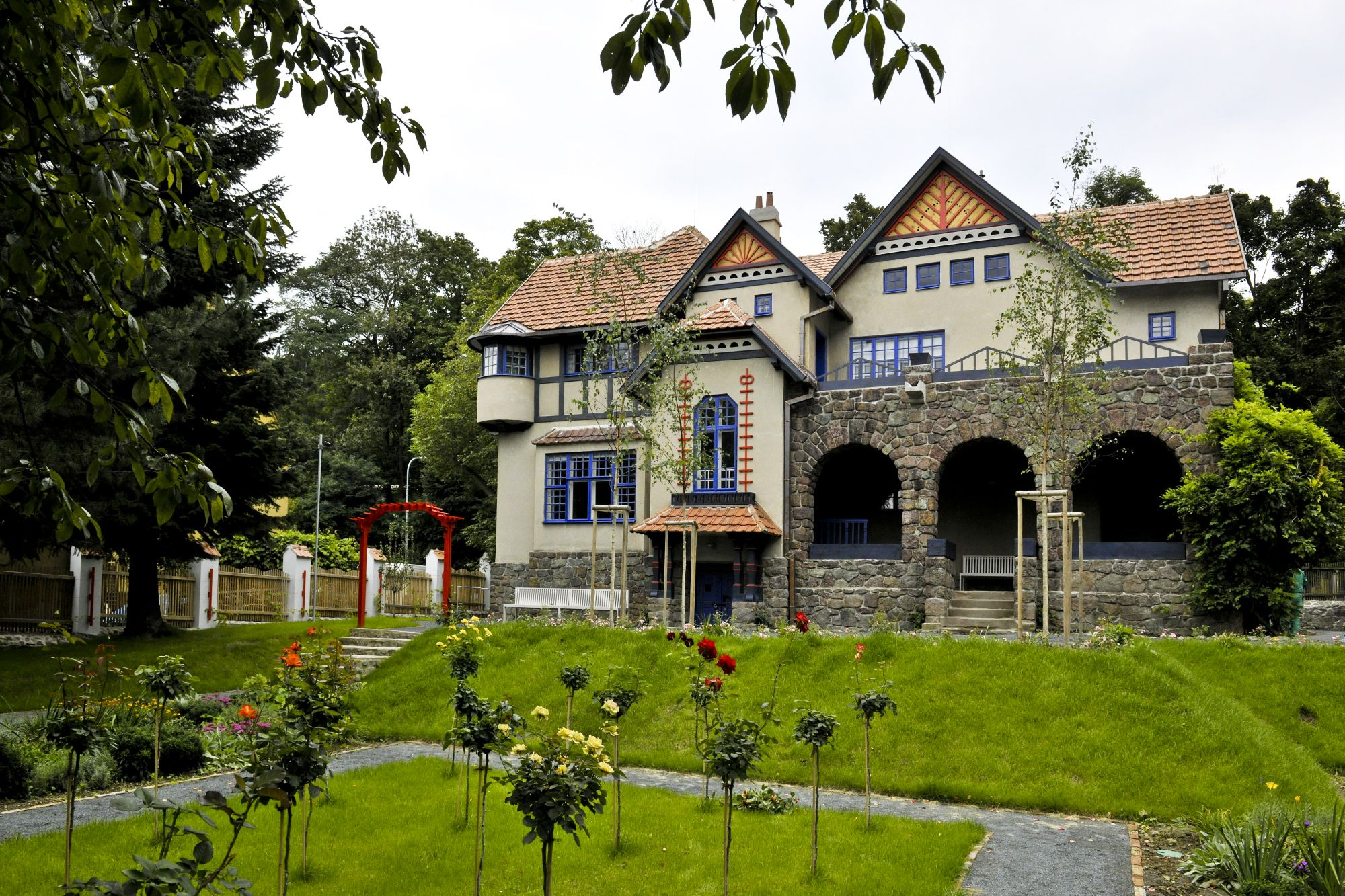
Jurkovič House

== Jurkovič House ==
The Art Nouveau Jurkovič Villa was built in 1906, and is a key surviving example of Dušan Jurkovič's work in the Czech Republic. It is situated at Jana Nečase 2, in woods overlooking the Svratka River in the village of Žabovřesky, now a Brno municipality. Jurkovič's design was inspired by the Arts and Crafts movement, combining a traditional housing style with elements of free and applied arts. The villa consists of a reception area near the entrance, a social area on the ground floor containing the architect's exhibition hall, a work space on the first floor, and private quarters on both floors.

== Josef Hoffmann Museum ==
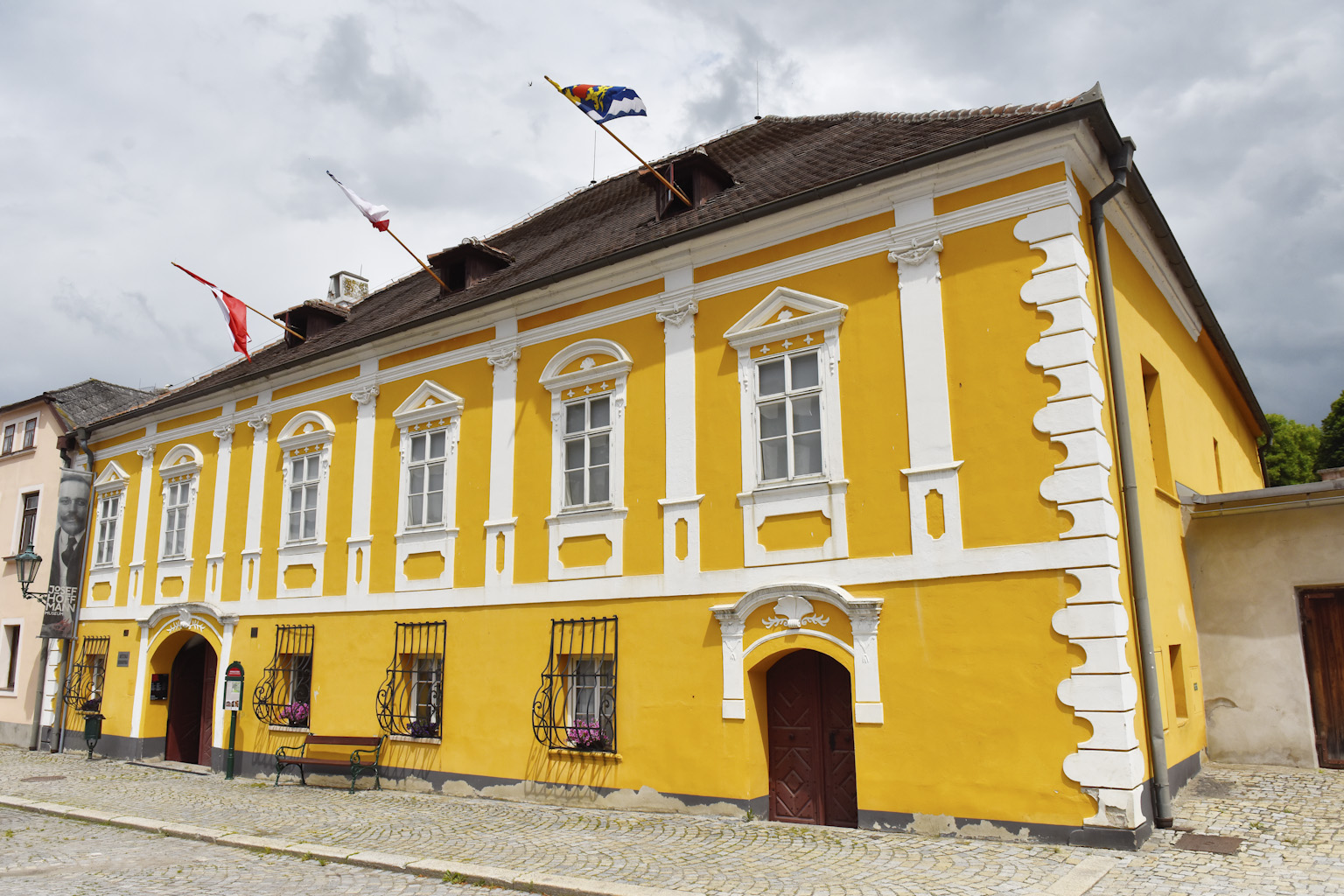
Josef Hoffmann Museum

The childhood home of architect Josef Hoffmann is on the eastern side of the town square of Brtnice, Vysočina Region. The building was created by unifying two houses after they had been damaged by a fire in 1760, and was owned by several generations of Hoffman's family, including his father who served as mayor of the town for 36 years. Hoffman refurbished the house sometime between 1907 and 1911 after his parents' death.

The house was confiscated in 1945 by the state, and later fell under the ownership of the local branch of the Communist Party. During this period the house fell into disrepair and the furniture was removed. After 1989 the house became municipal property and work began on its restoration, commissioned from Brno architects Hrůša & Pelčák and completed in 2003. The house is the property of the town of Brtnice, and has been under the administration of the Moravian Gallery since 1 January 2006. The Josef Hoffmann Museum is a joint branch of the Moravian Gallery and the Museum of Applied Arts, Vienna.
