= Namepiece =

In art history, a namepiece is an artwork after which an otherwise unnamed artist is named. There is a long history of giving notnames to artists whose identity has been lost.

The Master of the Life of the Virgin (active c. 1463 to c. 1490) and the Master of the Legend of the Magdalen (active c. 1483 – c. 1527) both named after scenes from the Life of the Virgin attributed to them, the Master of the Prado Adoration of the Magi (active c. 1475 – 1500) named after his most famous panel, and the Vienna Master of Mary of Burgundy (c 1470 – c 1480), named after a manuscript owned by one of his patrons. The Berlin Painter (active c. 490s-c. 460s BCE) was named by Sir John Beazley for a large lidded amphora in the Antikensammlung Berlin, the Berlin Painter's namepiece. Some more examples include:

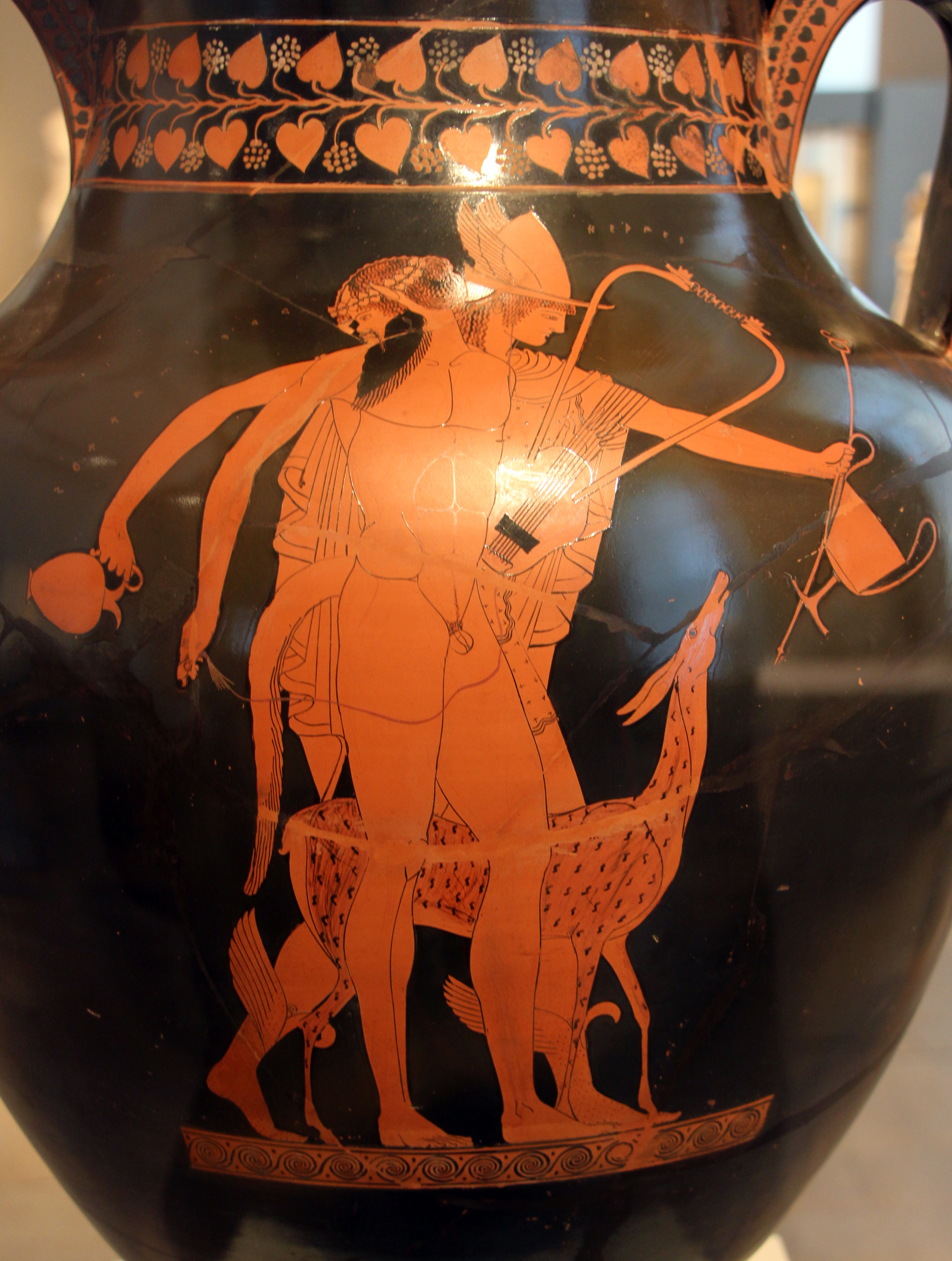
Image on Berlin Painter's namepiece vase.

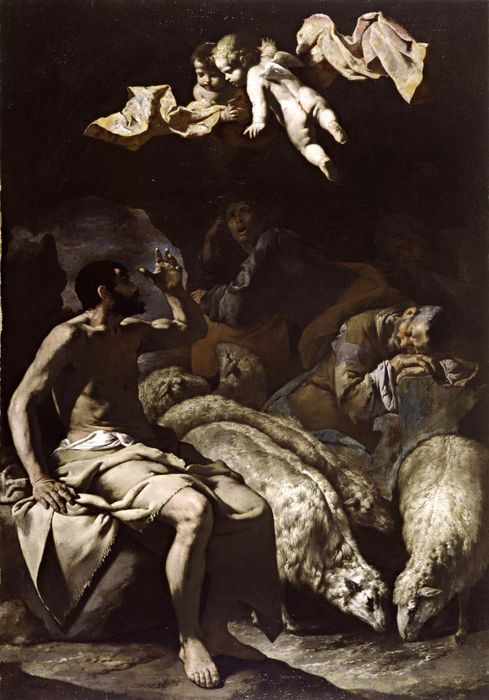
Annunciation to the Shepherds, c.1630, is an namepiece of Master of the Annunciation to the Shepherds

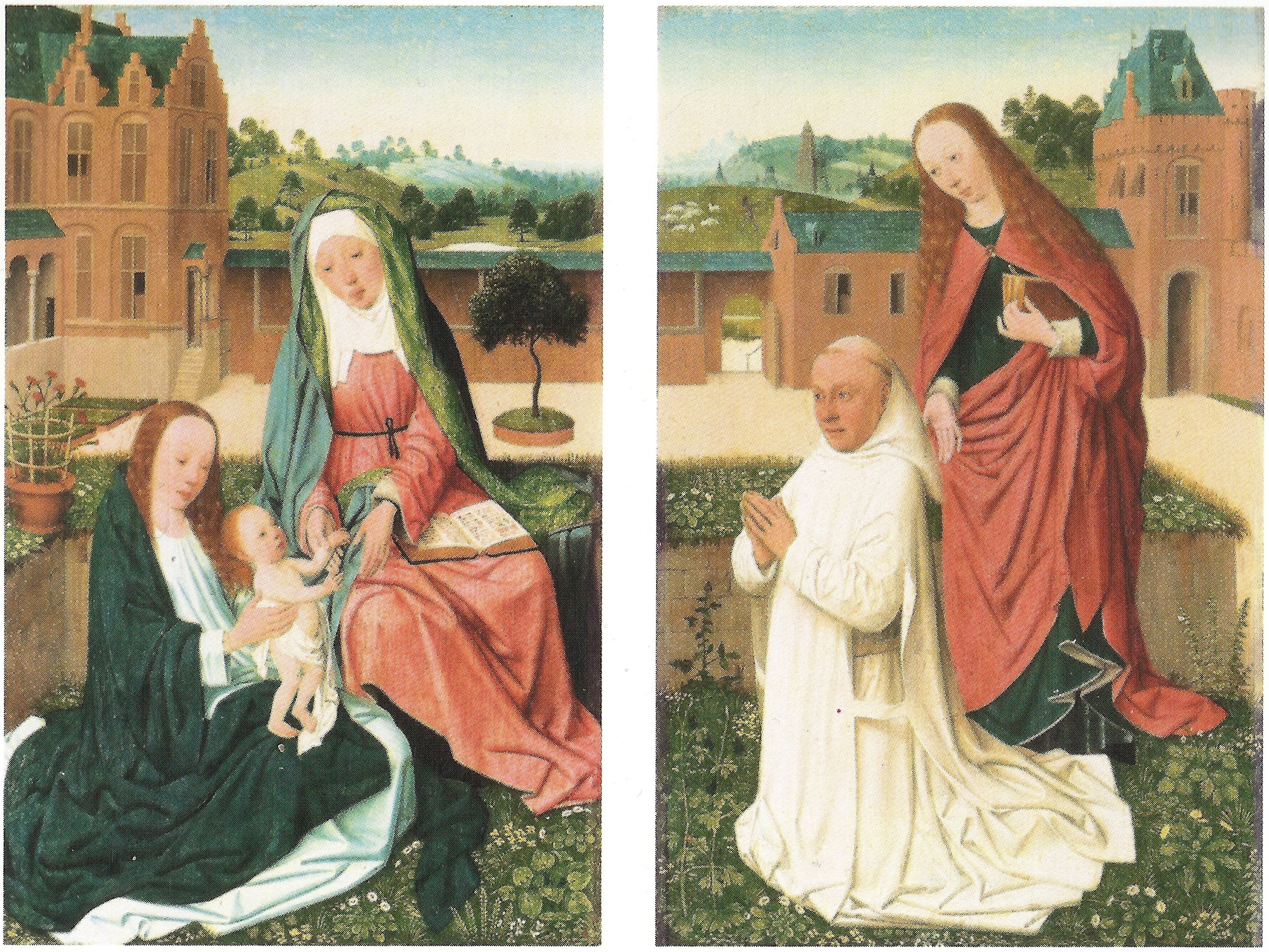
The Brunswick diptych, after which Master of the Brunswick Diptych was named.

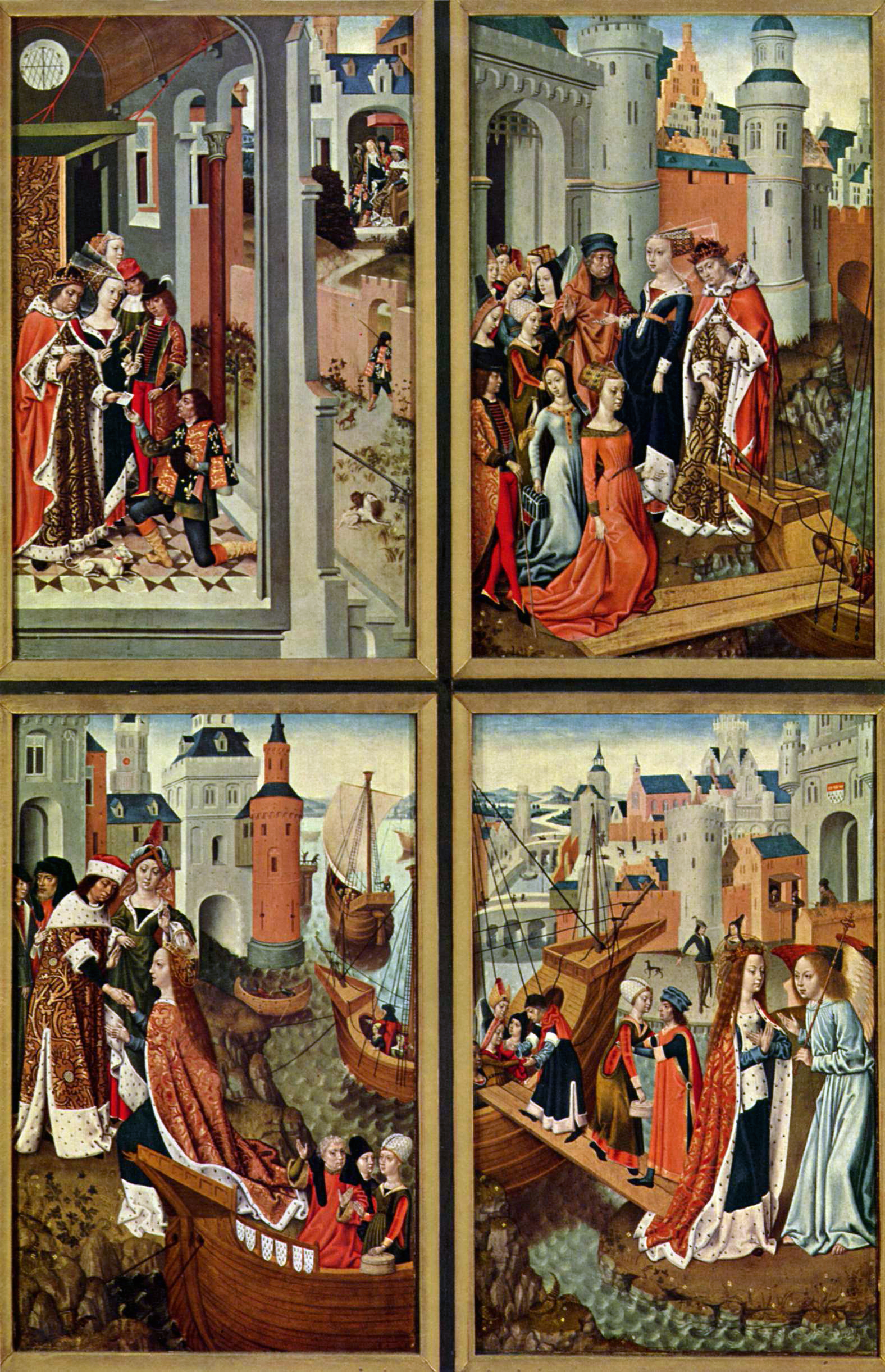
Master of the Legend of St. Ursula (Bruges) name is derived from a polyptych depicting scenes from the life of Saint Ursula painted for the convent of the Black Sisters of Bruges

== See also ==
- List of anonymous masters
- Notname
