= Pelike with actors preparing =

Ancient Greek two-handled jar

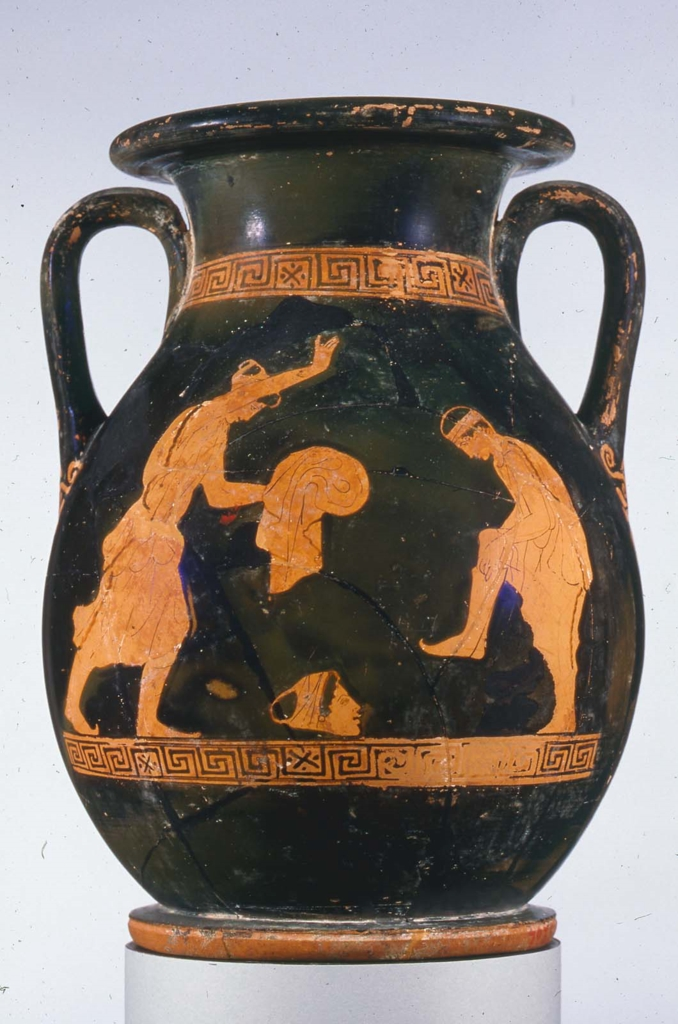
The pelike with actors putting on female costumes prior to a theatre performance. The figure on the left is wearing a mask and a second mask is lying on the ground between them. The masks represent a female and they have a kerchief around the hair on the mask. Their costumes also include female clothing such as high boots and a chiton. Ceramic Athenian Pelike. Phiale Painter. Ancient Greek. Around 430 BCE.

Pelike with actors preparing is a two-handled jar (pelike) depicting actors preparing for a performance. It is a piece of red-figure pottery measuring 24.1 centimetres (9.5 in) in height and 18 centimetres (7.1 in) in diameter. It was manufactured in Athens between 440–430 BC by the Phiale Painter and is held in the Greek Classical Gallery (Gallery 215C) at the Museum of Fine Arts (MFA) in Boston. It is thought to have been used for storage.

The item was brought to MFA by Edward Perry Warren. It was purchased by MFA from Edward Perry Warren. According to Warren It was bought by E. R. from Calabrese with the Pamphaios from excavations at Cerveteri in 1898.

== Artist ==
The Phiale Painter was based in Athens and is known for painting in the red-figure style. He specialized in painting small amphorae and lekythoi. Like most artists in antiquity, his real name is unknown, but his stylized work is what differentiates him from others

== Display ==
The Pelike with actors preparing is on display at the Boston Museum of fine arts in the Ancient World, Greek Classical Gallery. It on display in the section devoted to Greek arts and music. It can be seen on the Tragedy wall, amongst copies of masks and other Greek pottery depicting theater.

== Depiction ==
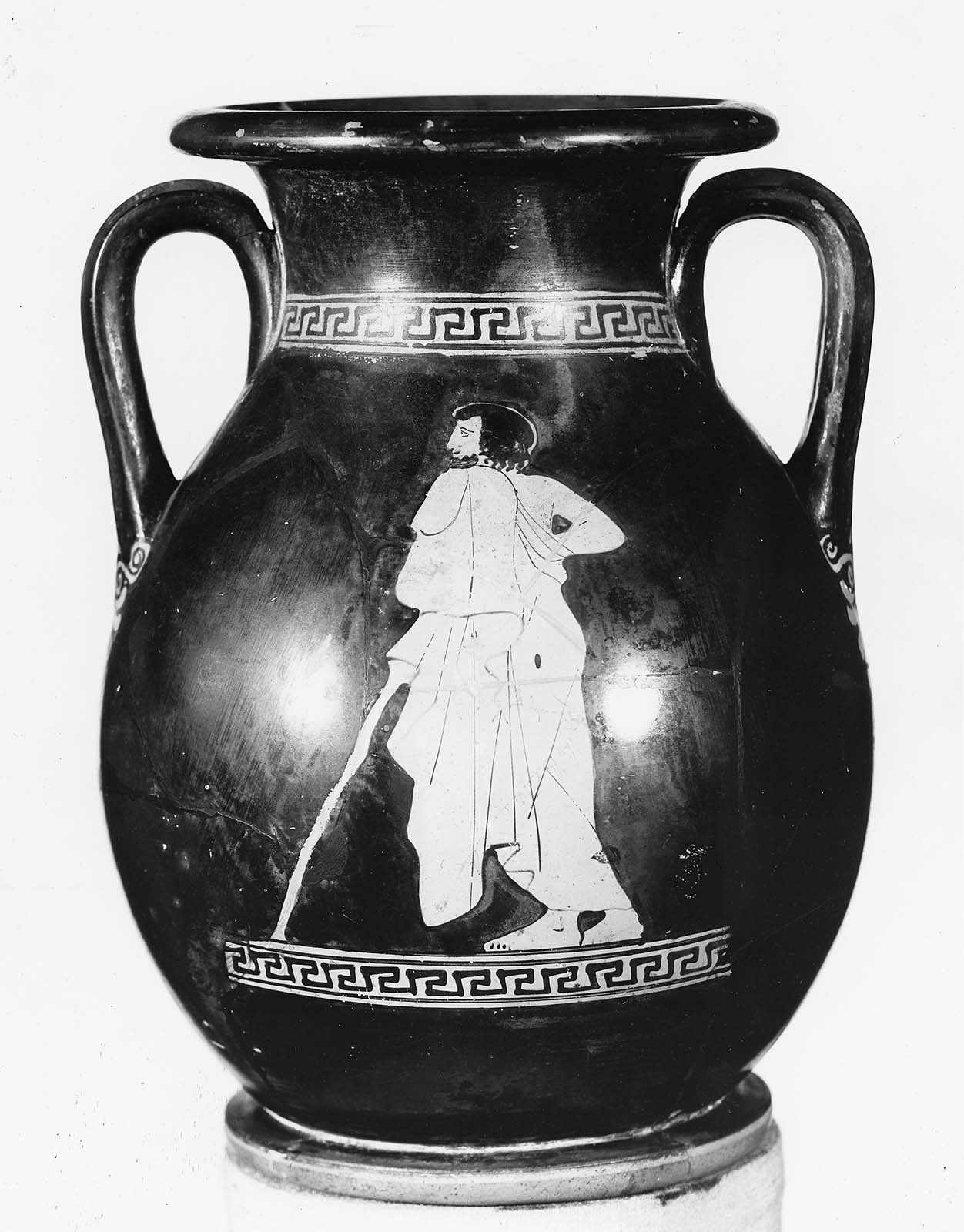
The other side of vessel

Theatre was an integral part of ancient Greek culture, displaying tales of mythology and heroes. The simplicity of the pelike’s background contrasts with the complex costumed characters rendered with contour and motion lines in drapery highlights the figures and the importance of the figures. The characters are centered on the pelike with stances slanted in order to mimic the shape of the vessel itself giving off a curvilinear theme with the borders of the scene contrast it by being rectilinear, serving as the boundaries of the scene depicted. In the classical style, the scene is a transitional scene catching the actors right before they take the stage. The scene contains no major action but because the scene contains actors it is important. Actors were seen as celebrities in ancient Greece.

Masks were an important part of Greek theatre, for in theatres such as the Theatre of Dionysus 14,000 people came to watch, including prisoners who were released just for theatrical events. The mouth of a mask was open, as shown in this pelike, and have amplification abilities. In combination with the seating arrangements, it allowed for the sound of the exaggerated actions of actors to be heard in the back row.

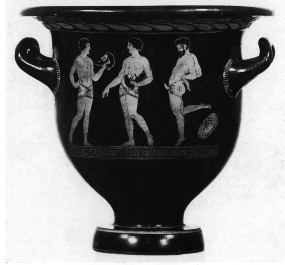
Mixing Vessel with Chorus men as Satyrs. Attributed to the Tarporley Painter. Greek, made in Apulia, 410–380 B.C. Terracotta. Nicholson Museum, Sydney.

It is thought that it is mainly men who were allowed to attend and participate in ancient Greek theatre, for it was only citizens who were allowed to partake, which included men of Greek descent, excluding women, slaves, and immigrants. This view is increasingly contested.Like everything else in Greek theatre, the costumes were exaggerated in order to be seen by the masses, including that of attire. As depicted in this vessel, men wore regular attire worn by women, a full-length chiton, and in this vessel, the boots highlighted being pulled on by the figure on the right may be depicted women from Thrace who wore boots such as that.

The other side of the pelike shows a bearded man in a himation, profile to left. Repaired with slight restoration. The MFA displayed this pelike with this side facing a wall.

== Similar items ==
Other surviving red-figure pottery vessels also depict comparable portrayals of theater in ancient Greece from around the same time period.
