= Persephone Painter =

Unnamed artist in Ancient Greece

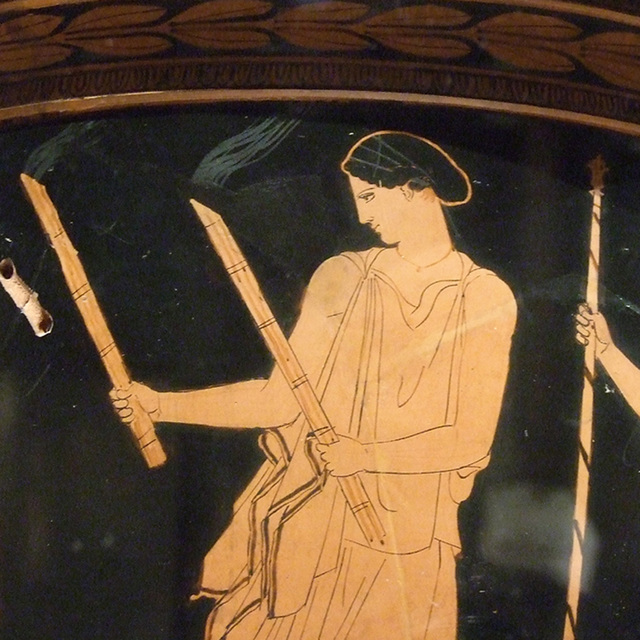
Detail of the bell-krater attributed to the Persephone Painter showing Hekate who holds two flaming torches to illuminate Persephone's journey from the Underworld. Metropolitan Museum of Art

The Persephone Painter, working from about 475 to 425 BCE, is the pseudonym of an ancient Attic Greek vase painter, named by Sir John Beazley after investigating a red-figure bell-krater vase of about 440 BC, which includes a mythological scene of the return of Persephone from Hades. This name vase of the Persephone Painter currently resides at the Metropolitan Museum of Art in New York City.

The Persephone Painter is known for his close relationship to the Achilles Painter, through whose workshop the Persephone Painter passed. Winfred van de Put suggested that Persephone Painter may be identified with the Thanatos Painter.

There are currently 26 works attributed to the Persephone Painter and these include both large and small vases.
