= Achilles Painter =

Greek vase painter

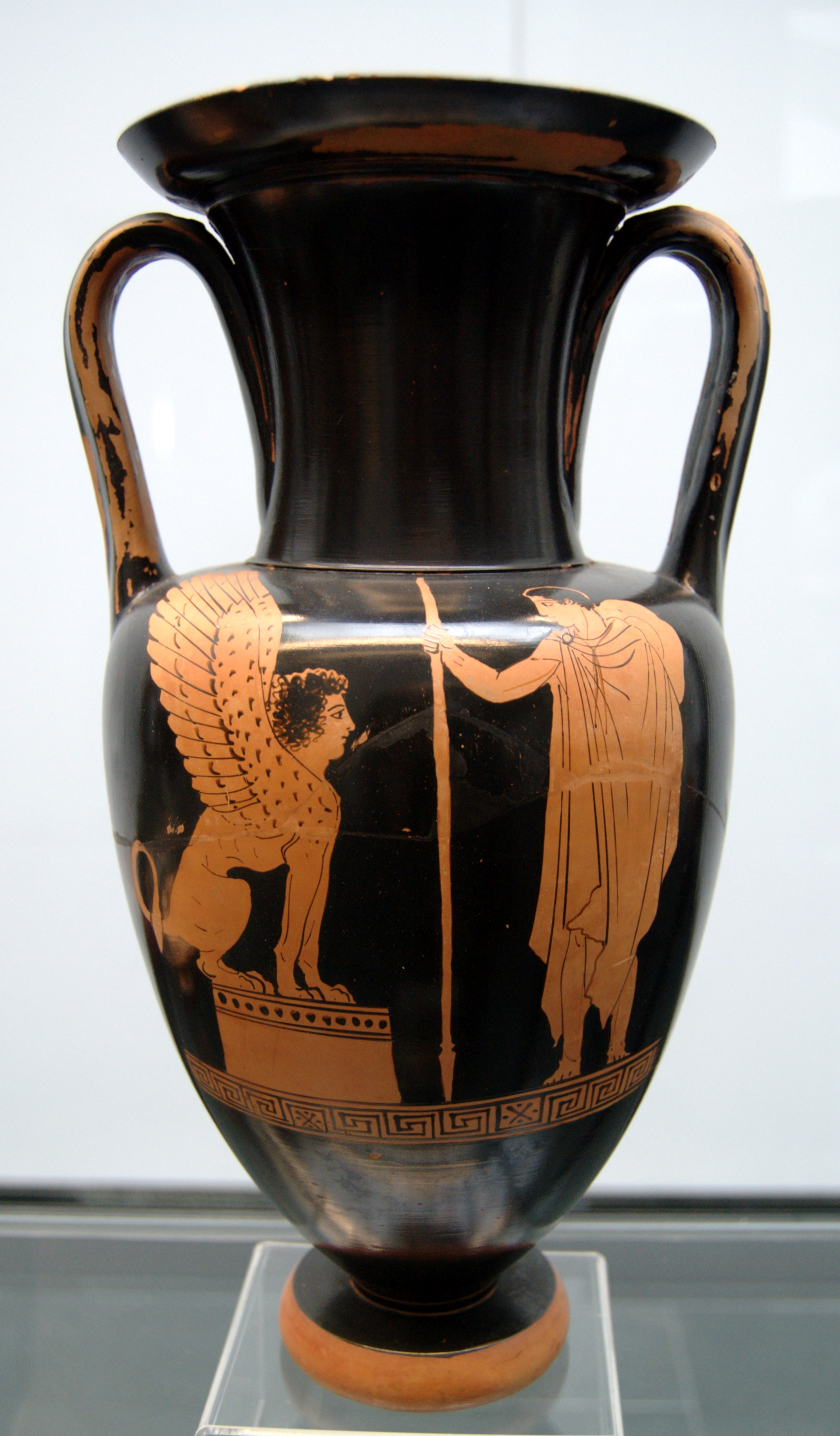
- Oedipus and the Sphinx, amphora by the Achilles Painter, located in the Staatliche Antikensammlungen, Berlin, Number SL 474
- Born: Unknown. Name assigned by Beazley after a theme of Achilles painted on a Lekythos in the Vatican Museums. Before 470 BC; Probably Athens
- Died: About 425 BC
- Education: Berlin Painter's workshop
- Known for: Pottery-making, vase painting. He took over the Berlin Painter's workshop.
- Notable work: Over 200 vases, mainly funerary lekythoi
- Movement: red-figure style, white ground technique

The Achilles Painter was a vase-painter active ca. 470–425 BC. His name vase is an amphora, Vatican 16571, in the Vatican Museums depicting Achilles and dated 450–445 BC. An armed and armored Achilles gazes pensively to the right with one hand on his hip. The other hand holds a spear. On the opposite surface a woman performs libation.

J. D. Beazley attributed over 200 vases to his hand, the largest share being red-figure and white-ground lekythoi. In his middle phase (ca. 450–445 BC), he decorates more open forms. The Achilles Painter was a late pupil of the Berlin Painter.

The Phiale Painter became the Achilles Painter's most prominent student after he assumed the Berlin Painter's workshop. Almost a dozen other recognizable painters passed through the Achilles Painter's workshop as well. Notable painters include the Westreenen Painter, the Persephone Painter, the Clio Painter, the Loeb Painter, and the Dwarf Painter. The Kleophon Painter, the Sabouroff Painter, and the Painter of Munich 2335 all spent time at the workshop as well.

== Appraisal ==
Beazley describes him thus:

He is the great master of the white lekythos. His red-figure vases nearly always have a sober beauty, but few of them–like the pointed amphora in the Cabinet des Médailles–reach the height of his best white lekythoi, which are among the masterpieces of ancient drawing.

In 1962, Greece issued a stamp featuring the decoration of an Achilles Painter white-ground lekythos.

== Findspots ==
- Acropolis, Athens
- Ceramicus, Athens
- Capua, Italy
- Pisticci, Italy
- Taranto, Italy
- Vulci, Italy
- Selinis, Sicily
- Enna, Sicily
- Attica
- Eretria
- Euboea
