= Master of the Embroidered Foliage =

Dutch painters (active 1480–1510)

Virgin and Child in a Landscape
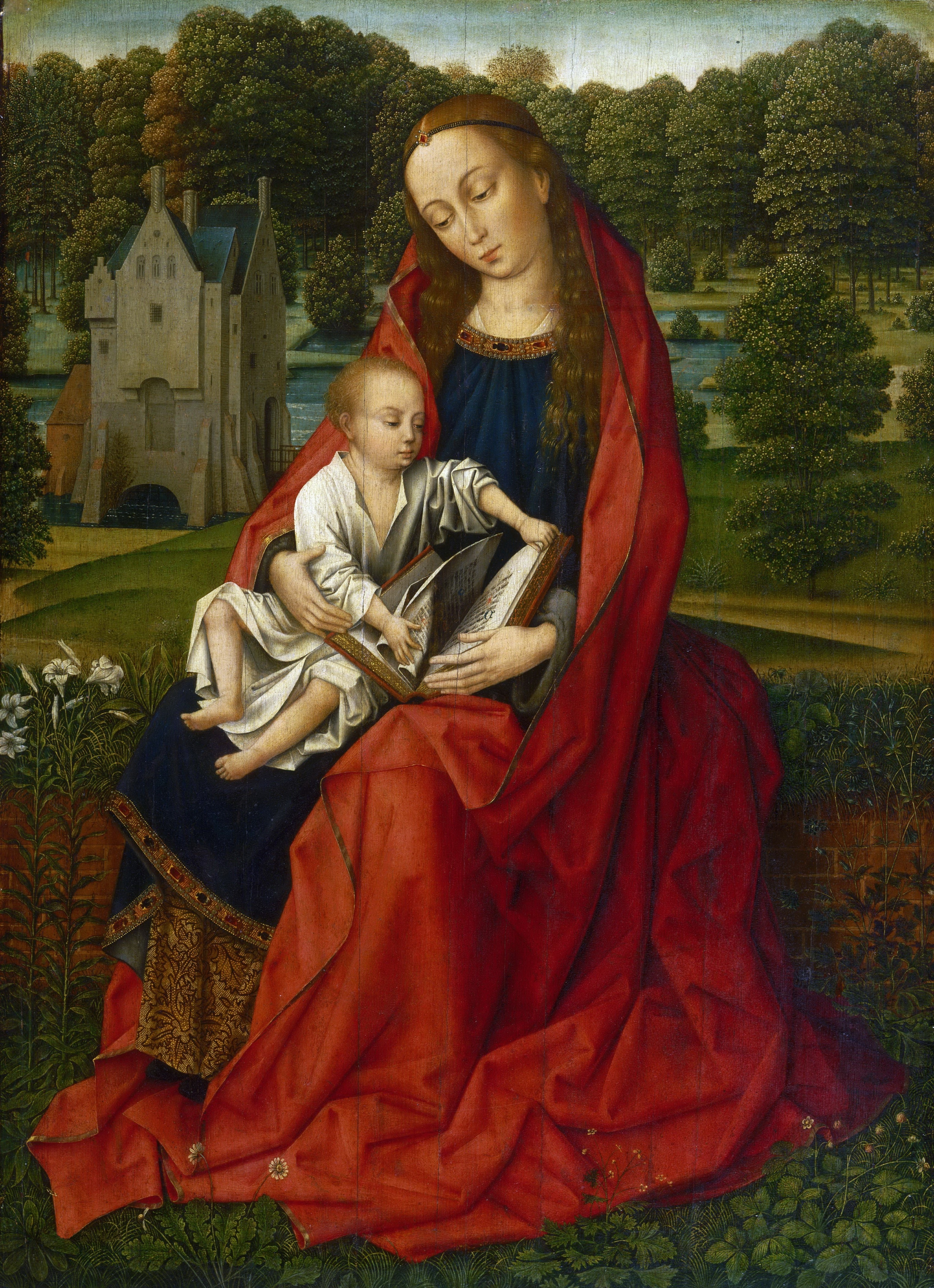
- Artist: Master of the Embroidered Foliage
- Year: circa 1490
- Medium: oil on panel
- Dimensions: 83.8 cm × 60.3 cm (33.0 in × 23.7 in)
- Location: Philadelphia Museum of Art
- Accession: 2518
- Website: Museum page

The Master of the Embroidered Foliage (active c. 1480 – c. 1510) is the Notname for an Early Netherlandish painter or a group of painters who worked out of Bruges and Brussels.

In 1926 the German art historian Max Jakob Friedländer attributed a group of paintings of the Virgin and Child in a landscape, in identical poses to the "Master of the Embroidered Foliage". The foliage painted in these works was likened by Friedländer to the repeated pattern of stitches in embroidery, thus the unusual name for the artist. The paintings show elements of previous works by Rogier van der Weyden and Hans Memling. Of the five paintings considered by Friedländer, three are in the United States, at the Philadelphia Museum of Art, Minneapolis Institute of Arts, and Clark Art Institute, and the other two in Europe, at the Groeningemuseum, Bruges, and the Musée des Beaux-Arts, Lille. Other paintings attributed to this group of artists are in the Louvre in Paris, the Detroit Institute of Arts, and in the National Gallery of Scotland, Edinburgh; these also show a very similar Virgin and Child, but against somewhat different backgrounds.

The Clark Art Institute conclude their investigation of the "Virgin and Child in a Landscape" paintings as follows: "Our analysis, based on laboratory study and consideration of fifteenth-century workshop practices, demonstrates that these panels were all produced between 1482 and the early 16th century not by one but by several artists, perhaps sharing a common template for the main figures. Unless further conclusive evidence comes to light, however, we will continue to attribute the paintings to the Master of the Embroidered Foliage, while acknowledging that this is a catch-all name referring to a number of painters active in Brussels and Bruges in the late 15th century."

== See also ==
- Aert van den Bossche

== Gallery ==
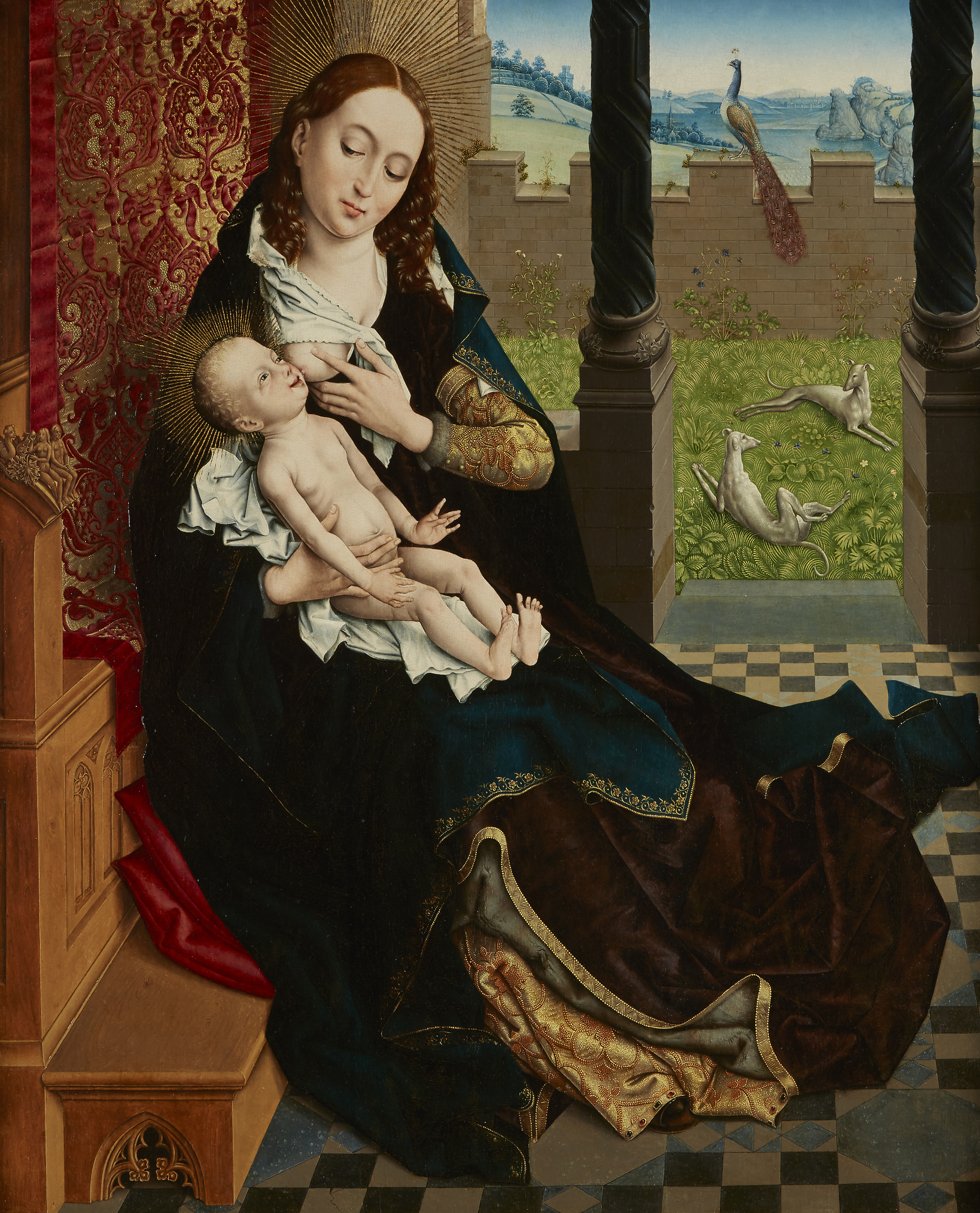
Nursing Madonna, oil on cradled panel, c. 1400s.

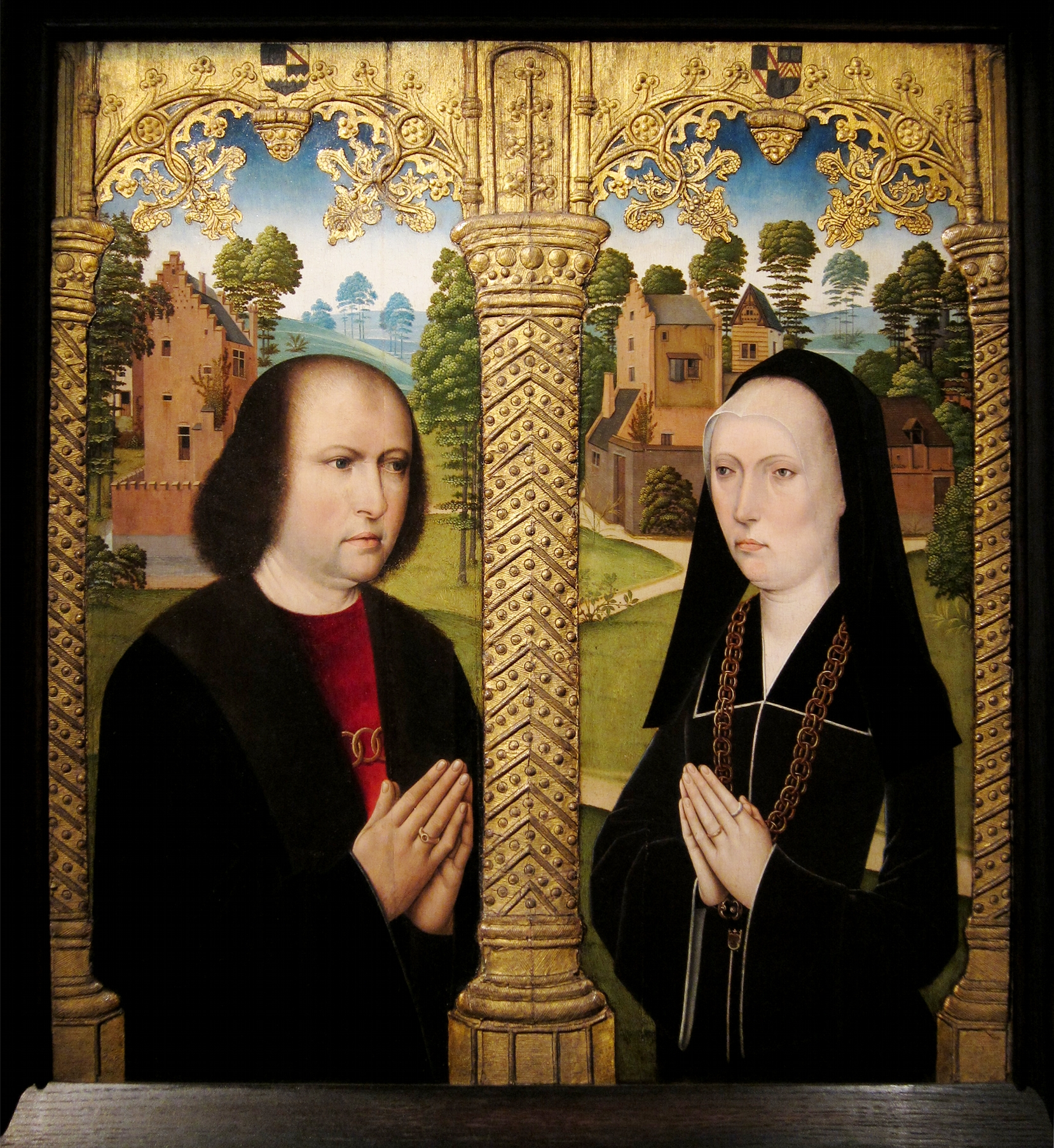
Portraits de Barbe de Croesinck et Louis Quarré en donateurs, oil on panel, c. 1480, Palais des Beaux-Arts de Lille.

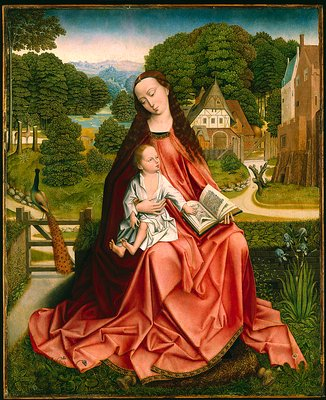
Virgin and Child in a Landscape, oil on panel, c. 1492–1498.
