= Notname =

Name given to artists with no known name

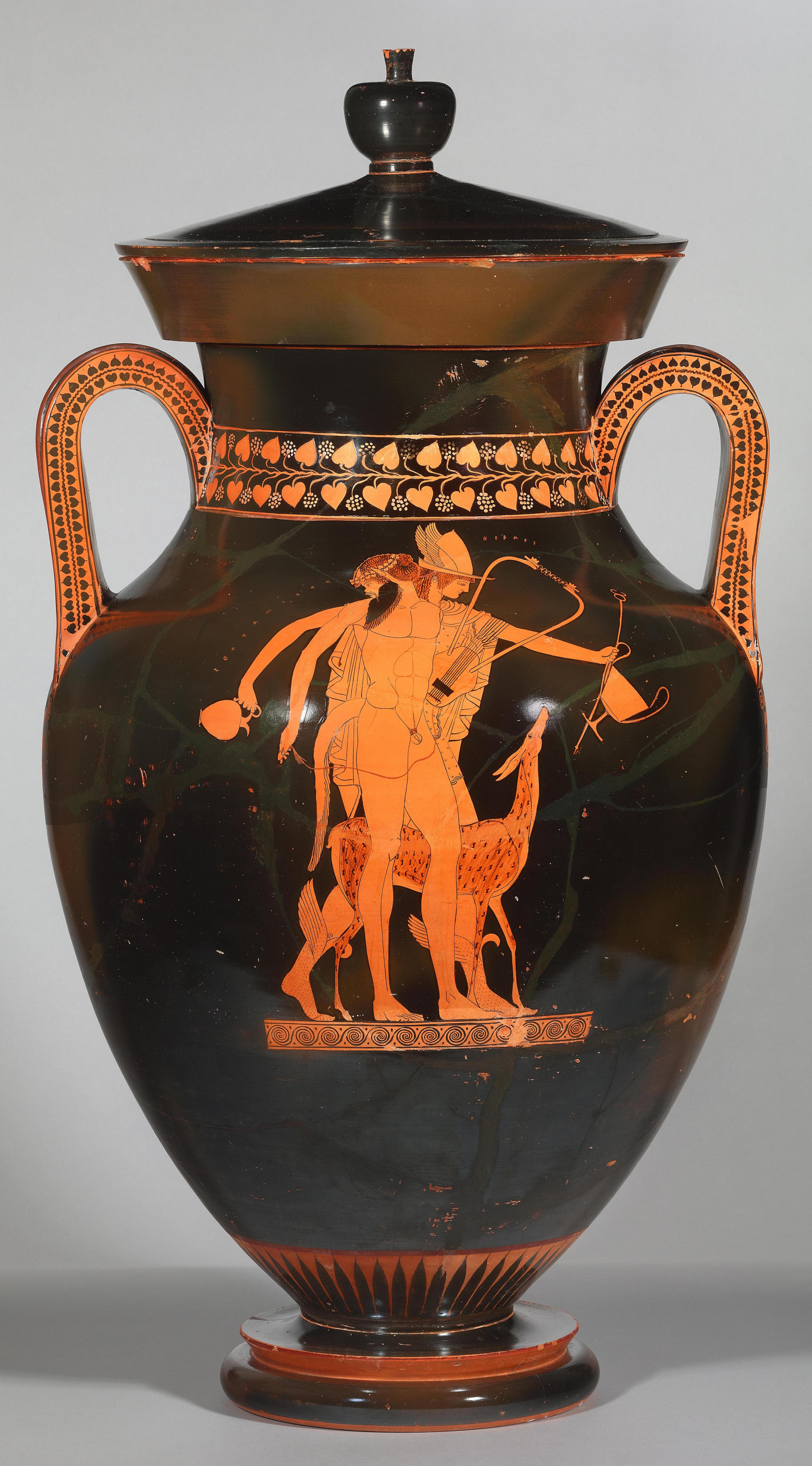
Berlin Painter's Name vase

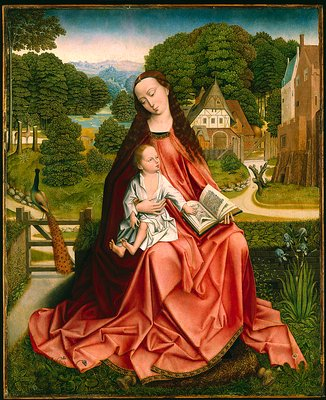
Virgin and Child in a Landscape, the Master of the Embroidered Foliage 1492–1498. Minneapolis Institute of Arts, Minneapolis

In art history, a Notname (German: [ˈnoːtˌnaːmə], "name of necessity" or "contingency name") is an invented name given to an artist whose identity has been lost. The practice arose from the need to give such artists and their typically untitled or generically titled works an acceptable if unsatisfactory grouping to avoid confusion when cataloging.

The phrases provisional name, name of convenience, and emergency names are sometimes used to describe anonymous masters. Nonce name was at one time used.

== Historiography ==
The practice of using generic names for unidentified artists is most common in the study of art of the antiquity, especially of the Roman era, and with artists of the Northern Renaissance until about 1430. Typically a pseudonym is applied after commonality is established for a grouping of works, of which a similarity of theme, style, iconography, biblical source or physical location can probably be attributed to one individual or workshop, but because of lack of surviving documentary record, the name of that individual is lost. Groupings of works under a given notname can often be contentious; in specific cases art historians have argued that the reality may be a group or school of artists working under a common influence or commercial demand. Linking a generically titled old master with a historical person is usually a tempting and exciting prospect, and would establish an art historian's reputation.

The given notname usually depends on the artist's location, the most distinctive feature of their work, or the theme or iconographic element they are best associated with. Some notnames are created based on a single artwork, called namepiece. Examples include the Master of the Embroidered Foliage (active c. 1480 – c. 1510) so named after his distinctive way of painting grass and trees, the Master of Sierentz (active c. 1440 – 1450), named for the presumed original location of his works, the Master of the Life of the Virgin (active c. 1463 to c. 1490) and the Master of the Legend of the Magdalen (active c. 1483 – c. 1527) both named after scenes from the Life of the Virgin attributed to them, the Master of the Prado Adoration of the Magi (active c. 1475 – 1500) named after his most famous panel, and the Vienna Master of Mary of Burgundy (c. 1470 – c. 1480), named after a manuscript owned by one of his patrons. The Berlin Painter (active c. 490s – c. 460s BCE) was named by Sir John Beazley for a large lidded amphora in the Antikensammlung Berlin, the Berlin Painter's namepiece.

In the case of 14th and early 15th-century Netherlandish, French and German painters and illuminators, the problem is particularly acute and stems from a number of factors. Primarily, the practice of signing and dating works is rarely seen in the region until the 1420s, and the inventories of collectors were uninterested in the artist's names. Many of the unidentified late 14th and early 15th-century northern artists were of the first rank, but because they have not been attached to any historical person, have suffered from academic neglect. It is probably a truism to say that, as Susie Nash put it, "much of what cannot be firmly attributed remains less studied". Some art historians believe that this has led to a lack of caution in connecting works with historical persons, and that such connections often hang on thin threads of circumstantial evidence. The identities of a number of well-known artists have been founded on the basis of a single signed, documented or otherwise attributed work, with similar works sharing close style or within a geographical range also attached to that name. Examples include Hugo van der Goes, Robert Campin, Stefan Lochner and Simon Marmion.

Similar cases also exist in other fields, for example, the Archpoet (c. 1130 – c. 1165) and the Gawain Poet (fl. late-14th century). There are even examples in history, to wit, the Unnamed 7th-century Serbian ruler.

== See also ==
- List of anonymous masters

== Sources ==
- Nash, Susie. Northern Renaissance art. Oxford: Oxford University Press, 2008. ISBN 0-1928-4269-2
- Nicole Reynaud, «Les Maîtres à “noms de convention”», Revue de l’art 42, 1978, p. 41
