= Master of Sierentz =

German painter

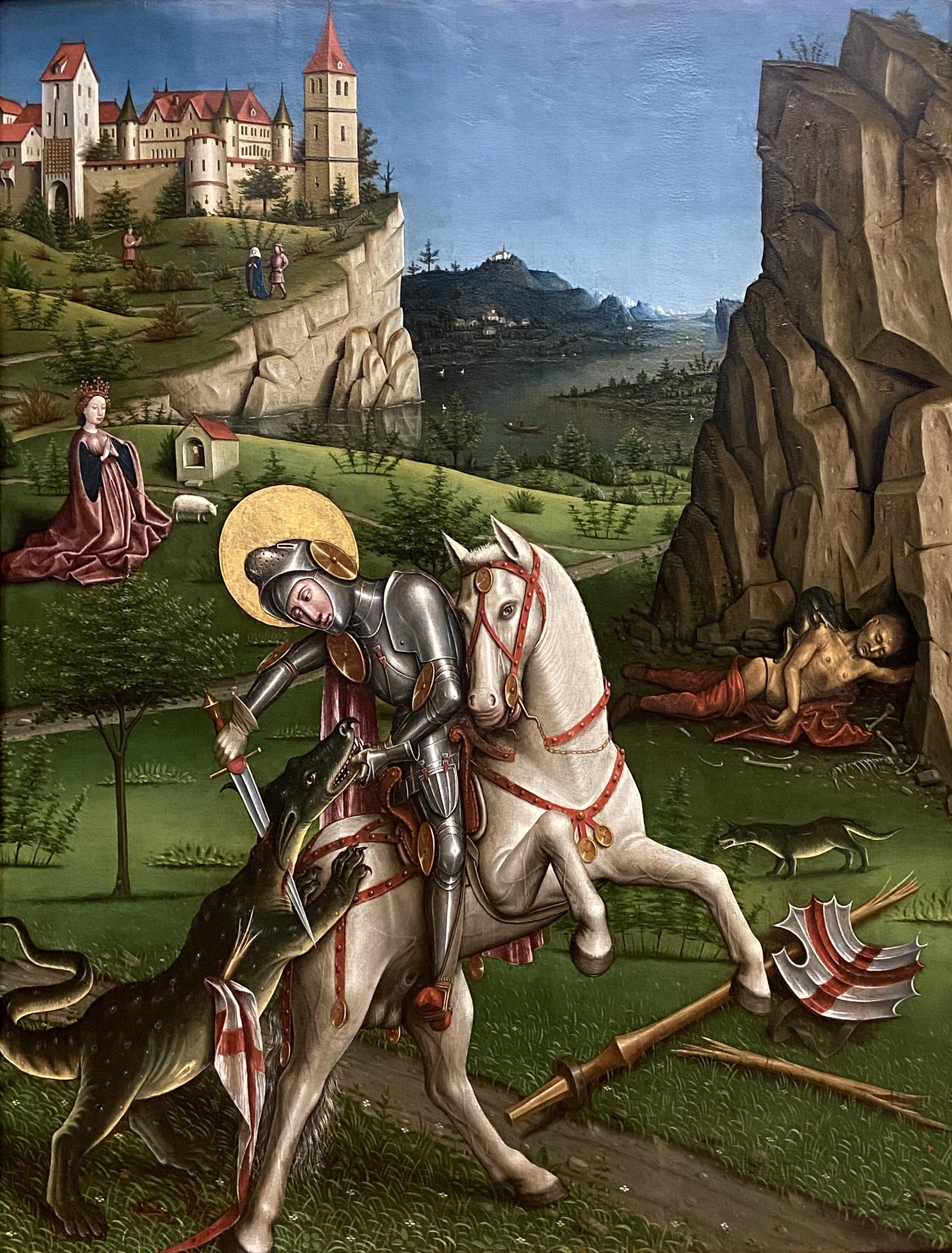
Saint Georg fighting with the dragon

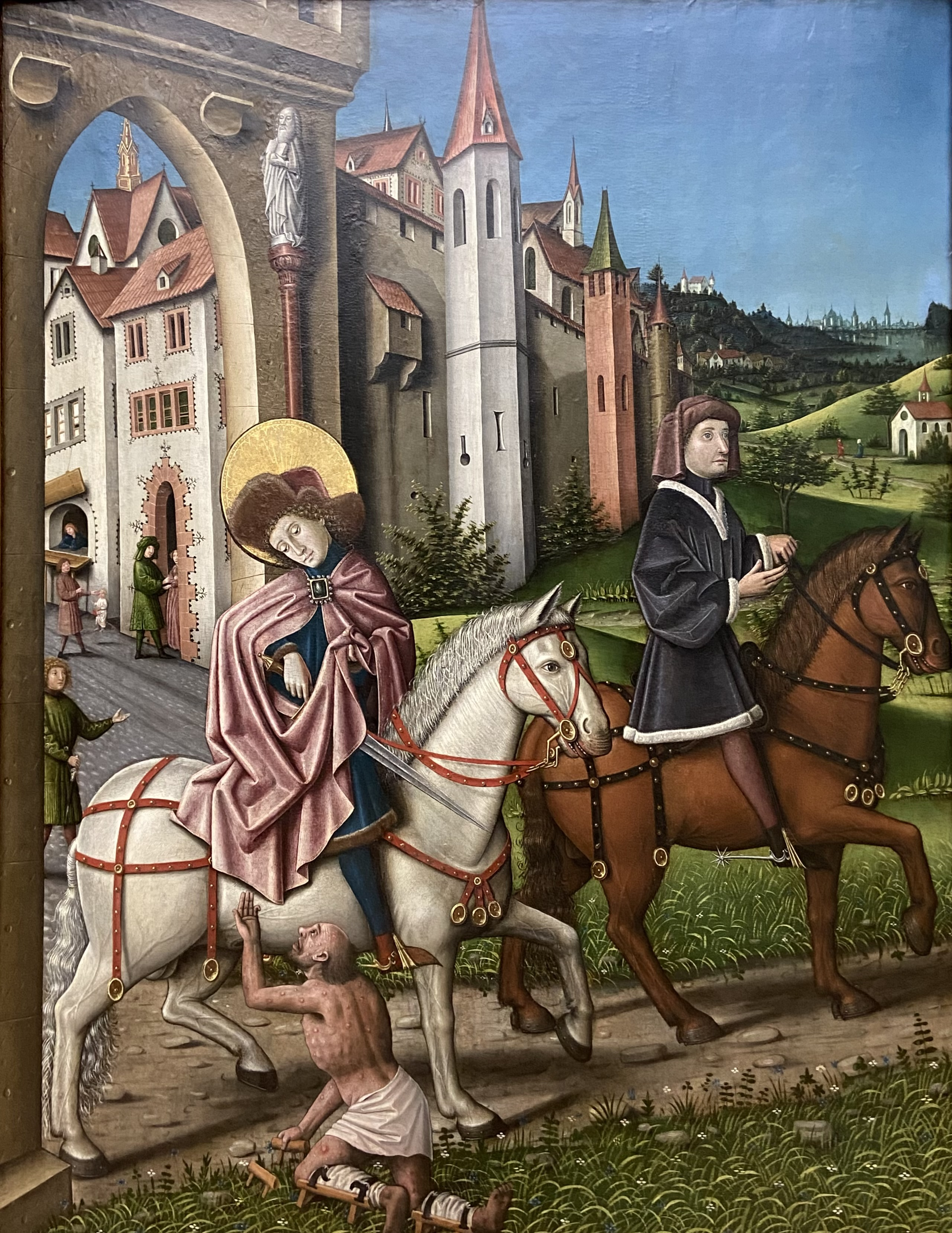
Saint Martin dividing the cape

The Master of Sierentz was a painter who is seen as a successor of the Swiss painter Konrad Witz. He is mainly known for his two paintings of Saint George stabbing the dragon and Saint Martin of Tours dividing his coat in two and sharing one half with a beggar which are assumed to have been painted between 1440 and 1450. Both works are exhibited in the Kunstmuseum Basel. The two panels were for some time assumed to have been the wings of a retable at a church in Sierentz, a locality near Basel, hence the artist's Notname "Master of Sierentz". It can't be confirmed with certainty that the retables were in Sierentz. The Master of Sierentz is not to be confused with the Master von 1445, who was initially seen as the painter of the two panels.

== The painting of the Saint George slaying the dragon ==
The centre piece of the painting is Saint George slaying a dragon with a sword. Behind in the next level in the painting there are two smaller dragons one of them threatening a man laying near the rocks in between bones of skeletons. Again a level behind there is depicted the praying and kneeling princess before a parish, who according to the legend, was promised as a sacrifice to the dragon. Beside her there is a lamb in the grass. Through all levels there is a bright green color which darkens slowly, turning into blue with the further levels of the painting towards the horizon in the distance, mainly beginning at the shores of the water. On a hill in the background there is a castle and at every level towards the horizon on the painting, the dimensions of the figures become smaller. The painting is on panel and has the dimensions of 144 × 110,5 cm.

== The painting of Saint Martin dividing his cape ==
In this painting Saint Martin is seen riding on a horse and accompanied by a man riding on a horse in front of him. As Martin is dividing his cape at the exit of a town, his company doesn't take notice of it. In front of Saint Martin is kneeling a beggar. Inside the town the houses are decorated with ornaments and there is seen a child riding on a hobby horse seemingly to imitate Saint Martin. The painting is on panel and has the dimensions of 144 × 111,5 cm.
