= Berlin Painter =

Unidentified ancient Greek vase painter

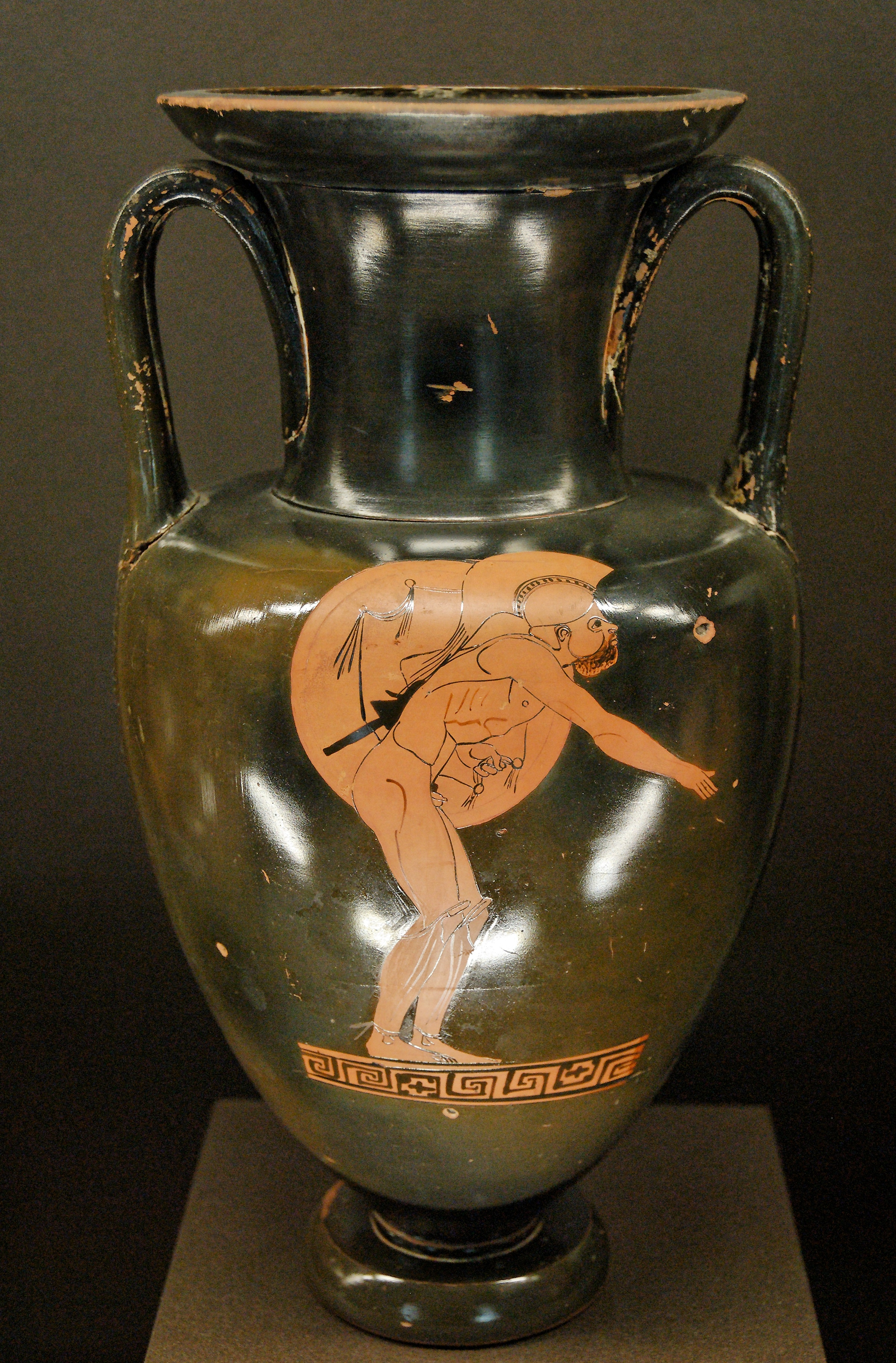
Neck amphora depicting an athlete running the hoplitodromos by the Berlin Painter, c. 480 BCE, Louvre

The Berlin Painter (active c. 490–460s BC) is the conventional name given to an Attic Greek vase painter who is widely regarded as among the most talented of his time. There are no painter signatures on any of the Berlin Painter's attributed works. From the surviving vases, it is safe to assume that he was a major painter, as there are over 400 vases and fragments attributed to him.

The Berlin Painter along with his apparent rival the Kleophrades Painter was educated by a member of the Pioneer Group, who introduced red-figure painting. The Berlin Painter began working in the Late Archaic style and helped develop the Classic style. Over a long career he trained many younger vase-painters, including, probably, the Achilles Painter.

The majority of his works have been found across Italy. This may suggest that they were created for export to the Italian market. Many of his valued works were preserved as élite grave goods in the necropoleis of Magna Graecia and Etruria, notably at Vulci, Nola and Locri.

In 2017, Princeton University did a showcase, The Berlin Painter and his World. A book was also published, the first to focus on The Berlin Painter since John Beazley's Der Berliner Maler.

== Forms and repertoire ==
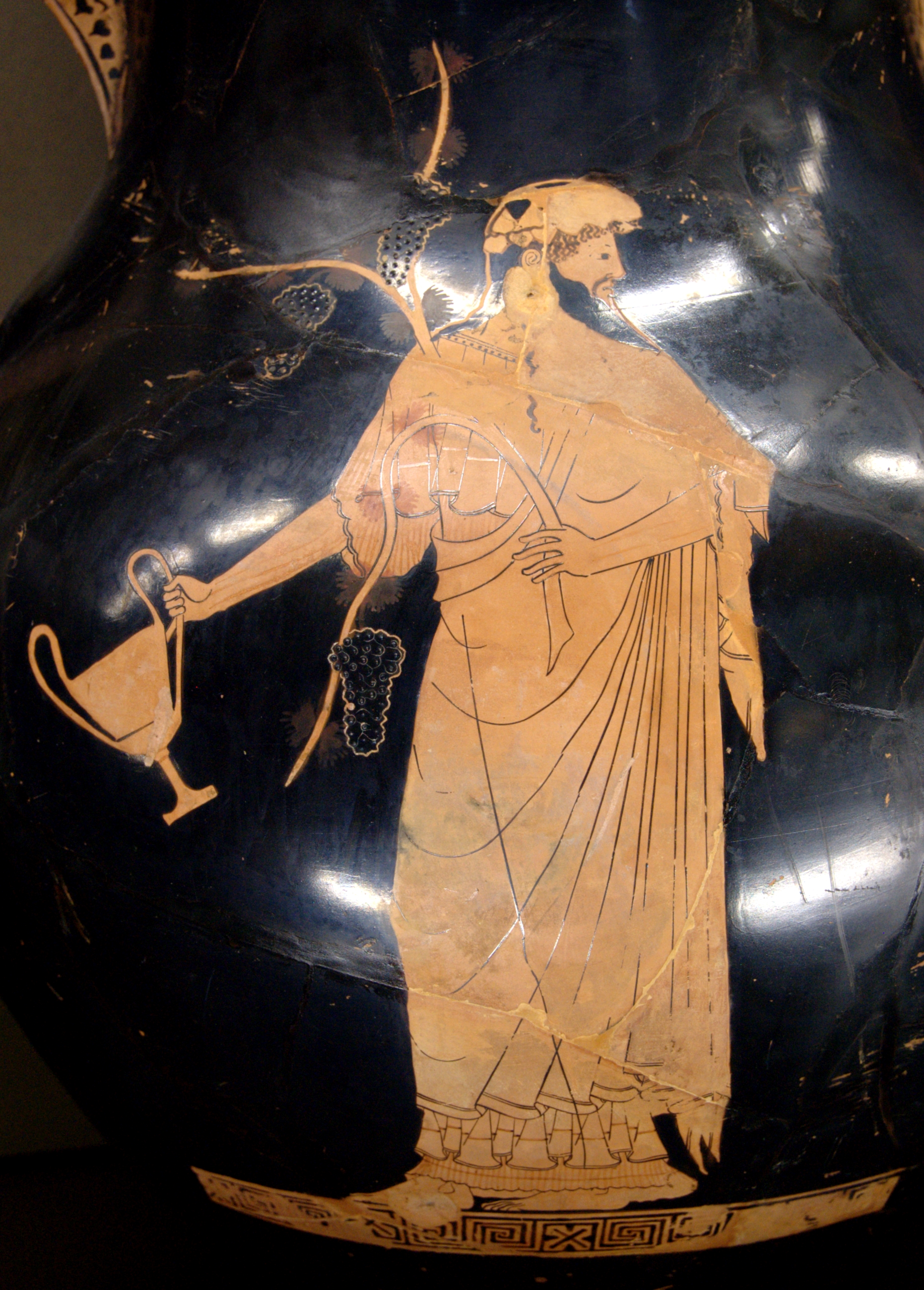
Dionysos holding a kantharos (drinking cup). Side A from an Attic red-figure amphora, c. 490–480 BCE. Found in Vulci, Italy.

Red figure vase-painting was invented around 530 BC. Before then black-figure vases were popular. The earliest works attributed to the Berlin Painter occur around 505 BC, attesting to his being educated by the red-figure Pioneer Group.

The Berlin Painter utilized a variety of different shapes. His most popular shape is the amphora. He produced a series of Panathenaic amphora, which are his only black-figure vases. (Note: The Panathenaic amphora featured a depiction of the event for which it was the prize, and on the opposite side Athena. The Athena on his Panathenaic amphora was always depicted with a gorgoneion on her shield.) He painted a number of Nolan amphora, and was responsible for the popularity of that form. He also painted on water jars (hydriai), large wine bowls (kraters), or smaller shapes such as jugs (oinochoai) and oil bottles (lekythoi).

His two most popular characters from mythology are Athena and Apollo. Fawns and Greek animals are also popular themes in his work, which varied from mythological themes to athletes. One "masterpiece" is a hydra in the Vatican. Apollo is seated on a large tripod with wings, with which he flies over the sea escorted by two dolphins in the act of diving.

On several of his vases, painted red figures are isolated or paired without framing devices against a glossy black ground. So integral to the forms of their superbly-made bodies; it is thought the wares themselves were also produced in his shop. The tall figures often start near the middle of the vase and continue over the shoulder, stopping at the neck. He pays close attention to the drapery of their clothing, and their facial features. Most notable is the eye, which is typically open, long, and with the pupil towards the inner eye.

The Berlin Painter used dilute glaze to add red tones onto his vases. This is clear on the fawn's coat in his namepiece. He is also known for his careful key patterns, which border the bottom of his single figures, and are unique to the Berlin painter and his students. The pattern features alternating meander boxes with alternating saltire squares.

== Name vase ==
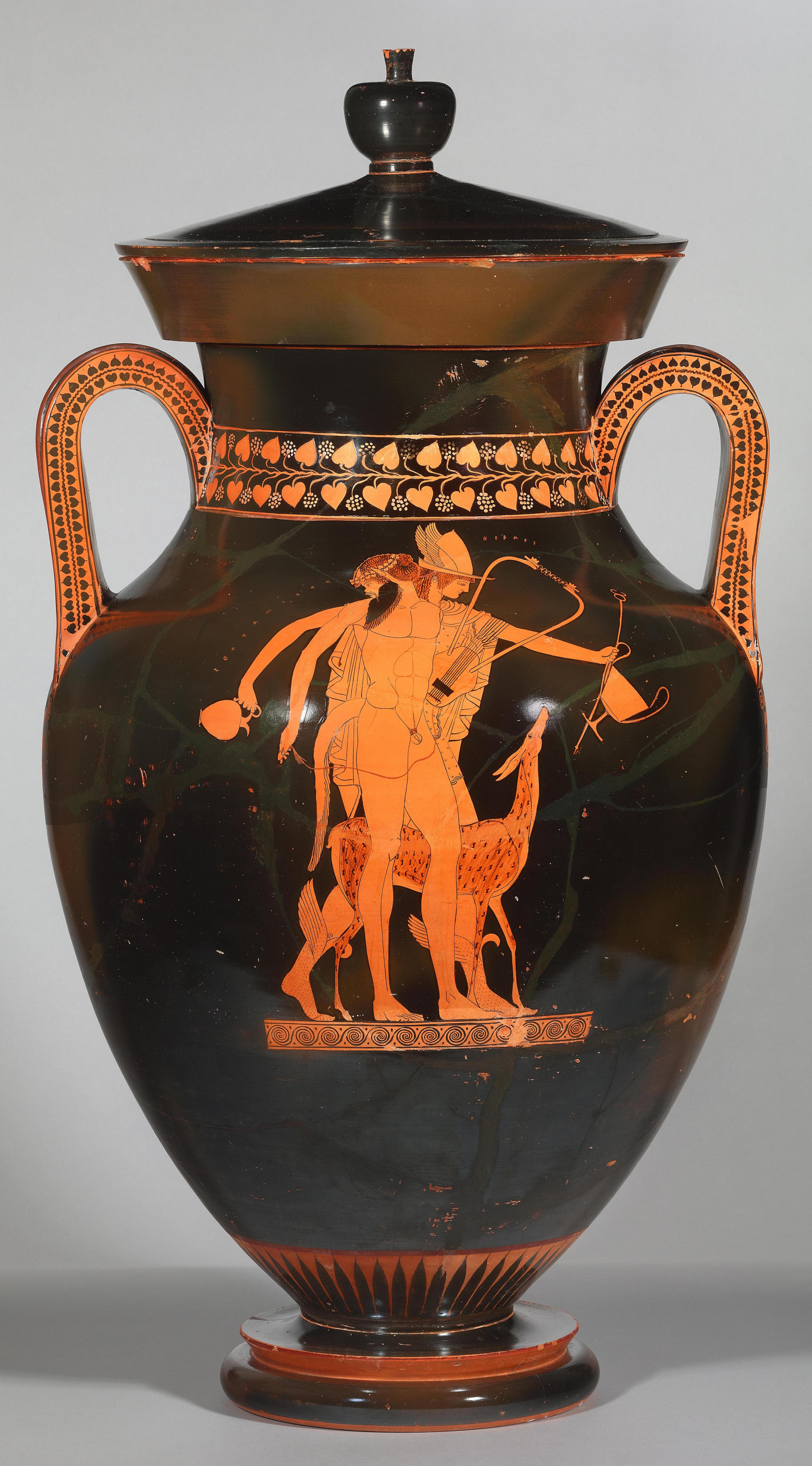
Berlin Painter's namepiece

The Berlin Painter was named by British art historian Sir John Beazley in 1911 for a large lidded amphora in the Antikensammlung Berlin (the Berlin Painter's name vase). The vase is in good condition. The obverse is well preserved, but the reverse has suffered surface wear and discoloration.

Side A: satyr and Hermes. Hermes strides to the right swinging his arms. He holds a large kantharos and a kerykeion (herald's wand) in his forward hand, and a small oinochoe in his hand which he swings behind him. He is dressed in a short tunic and chlamys, and wears a winged cap and winged boots. A satyr stands in front of him facing right, his head turned to the left. He is holding a barbiton (lyre) in one arm, his fingers splayed across the strings. In his other hand, held out behind him, he holds the end of a string attached to the lyre. He has a long beard and wears a wreath, and his right leg is shown in three-quarters view. A fawn stands between the two figures, its head gracefully turned up. The figures are carefully superimposed on one another, forming a unified contour isolated against the black background of the vase.

Side B: Satyr. A satyr stands to the right, holding a large kantharos and a lyre. The kantharos is raised to his lips, while he holds the lyre at his side, his fingers touching the stings. His long hair is tied at his neck and he wears a wreath. Above the scene is a carefully drawn band of ivy leaves and grape bunches; below, forming a groundline but not extending all the way around the vase, is a running spiral, a rare pattern ornament in Attic Red Figure vase paintings.

== Kithara Player at the Met ==
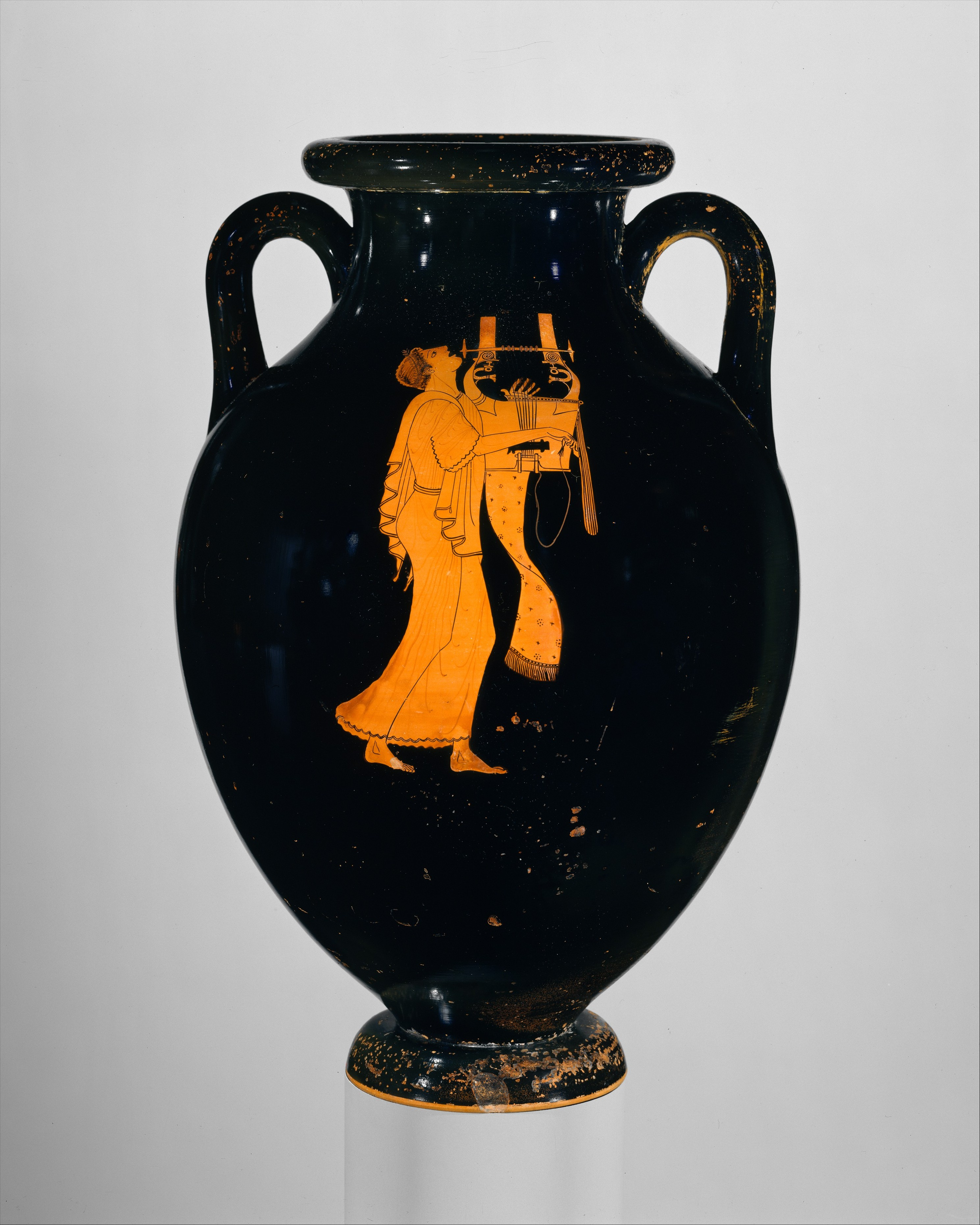
Kithara player, c. 490 BC

A masterpiece of Greek vase painting is the kithara player and singer attributed to the Berlin Painter and held at the Metropolitan Museum of Art. On the obverse, a singer tilts his head back and sings. He wears a crown of laurel leaves, and so has just won a musical competition. The amphora filled with wine or olive oil may have been the prize. The curve of the instrument mimics the curve of the vase, and the fabric seems to undulate with the music. On the reverse is a judge or trainer. It is dated to 490 BC, the same time as the Battle of Marathon.

== Sources ==
- Artcyclopedia - Berlin Painter
- The Berlin Painter: Archaeology of the Corpus Present and former whereabouts of the vases attributed to the Berlin Painter.
- Perseus Project: "Thirty-three Vases whose Painter is 'Berlin Painter'"
- Antikenmuseum, Basel: Lidded Amphora
- Altes Museum, Berlin: Amphora attributed to the Berlin Painter
- Martin Robertson. The Art of Vase-Painting in Classical Athens. Cambridge: Cambridge University Press, 1994. ISBN 978-0-521-33881-3 (ISBN 0521338816).
- Andrew J. Clark, Maya Elston, and Mary Louise Hart. Understanding Greek Vases: A Guide to Terms, Styles, and Techniques. Getty Museum Publications, 2002.
- Donna Carol Kurtz (editor). The Berlin Painter: Drawings by Sir John Beazley. Oxford Monographs on Classical Archaeology, 1983.
- J. Michael Padgett (editor). The Berlin Painter and his World: Athenian Vase-Painting in the Early Fifth Century B.C. Princeton/New Haven 2017.
