= Master of the Prado Adoration of the Magi =

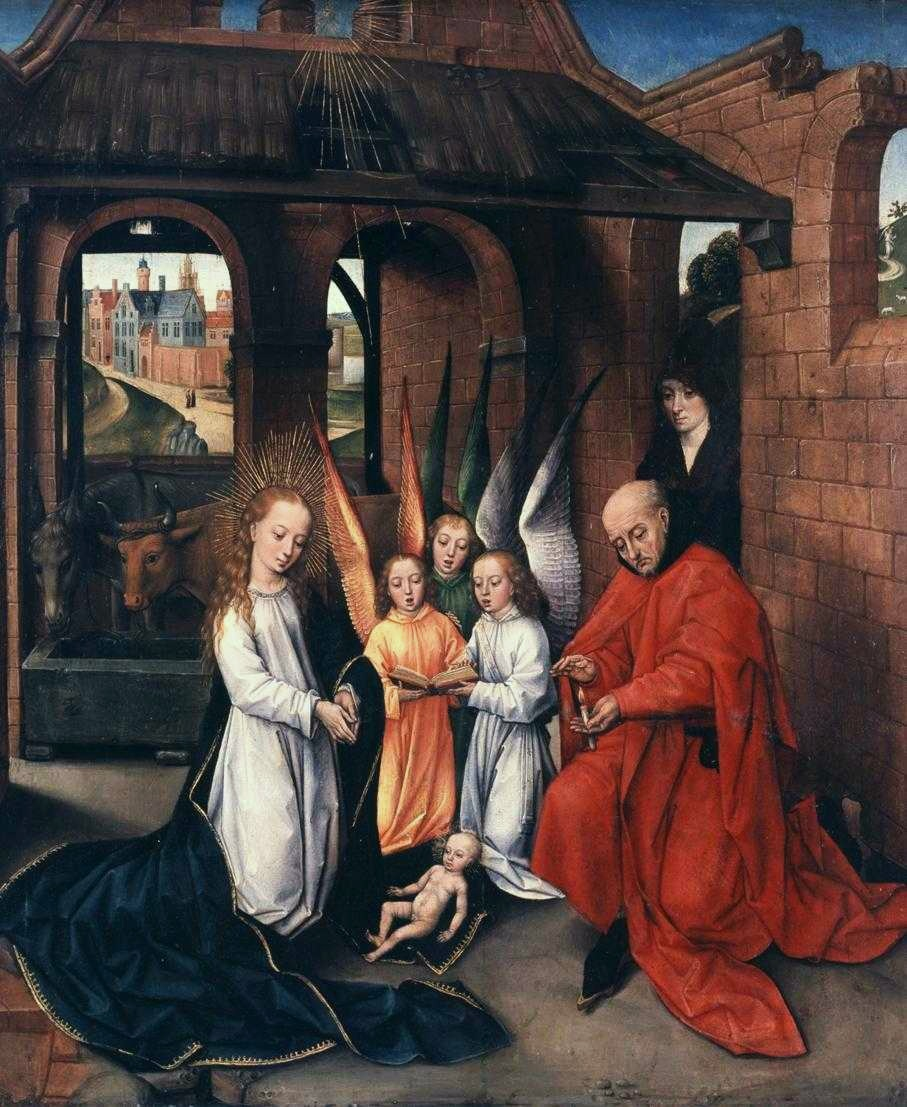
Nativity, c.1475-1500. Birmingham Museum and Art Gallery. Left wing, previously attributed to Hans Memling.

The Master of the Prado Adoration of the Magi was a Netherlandish painter active between c. 1475 and 1500 whose identity is now lost. He is thought to have originated from the southern Netherlands and is known for his vibrant colourisation in panels depicting scenes from the infancy of Christ, he is thought to have been a pupil of Rogier van der Weyden, and is named after a copy of the "Adoration of the Magi" panel from that painter's St Columba Altarpiece. Although the Magi became a popular topic for northern painters in the second half of the 15th century and the Columba altarpiece was widely copied, the master is associated with van der Weyden's workshop because the copy is so close, it is believed he must have had access to a reproduction of the underdrawing.

Six panels are today associated to the master; five showing scenes from Christ's infancy and one of Saint Francis. Two panels now in the Burrell Collection in Glasgow, are assumed to be wings of a lost portable triptych. All six works had been attributed by art historian Georges Hulin de Loo to Hans Memling, a painter strongly influenced by van der Weyden (although this would date the work as 1464 at latest). de Loo noted the Glasgow panel's "elegance and sensitivity", and speculated that they were based on prototypes by van der Weyden, perhaps finished by Memling under van der Weyden's supervision. However this view was eventually rejected and the panels attributed to an unidentified painter, who had apprenticed under van der Weyden and was in contact and influenced by Memling and the Master of the Legend of St. Catherine, who is sometimes thought to have been Pieter van der Weyden, Rogier's son.

== Attributed works ==
- Adoration of the Magi - c. 1470 – 1480. Prado, Madrid
- The Flight into Egypt -
- Presentation at the Temple - c. 1470 – 1480. National Gallery of Art, Washington D.C.
- Virgin Annunciate - Burrell Collection, Glasgow.
- Nativity - c. 1475 – 1500. Birmingham Museum and Art Gallery.

== Gallery ==
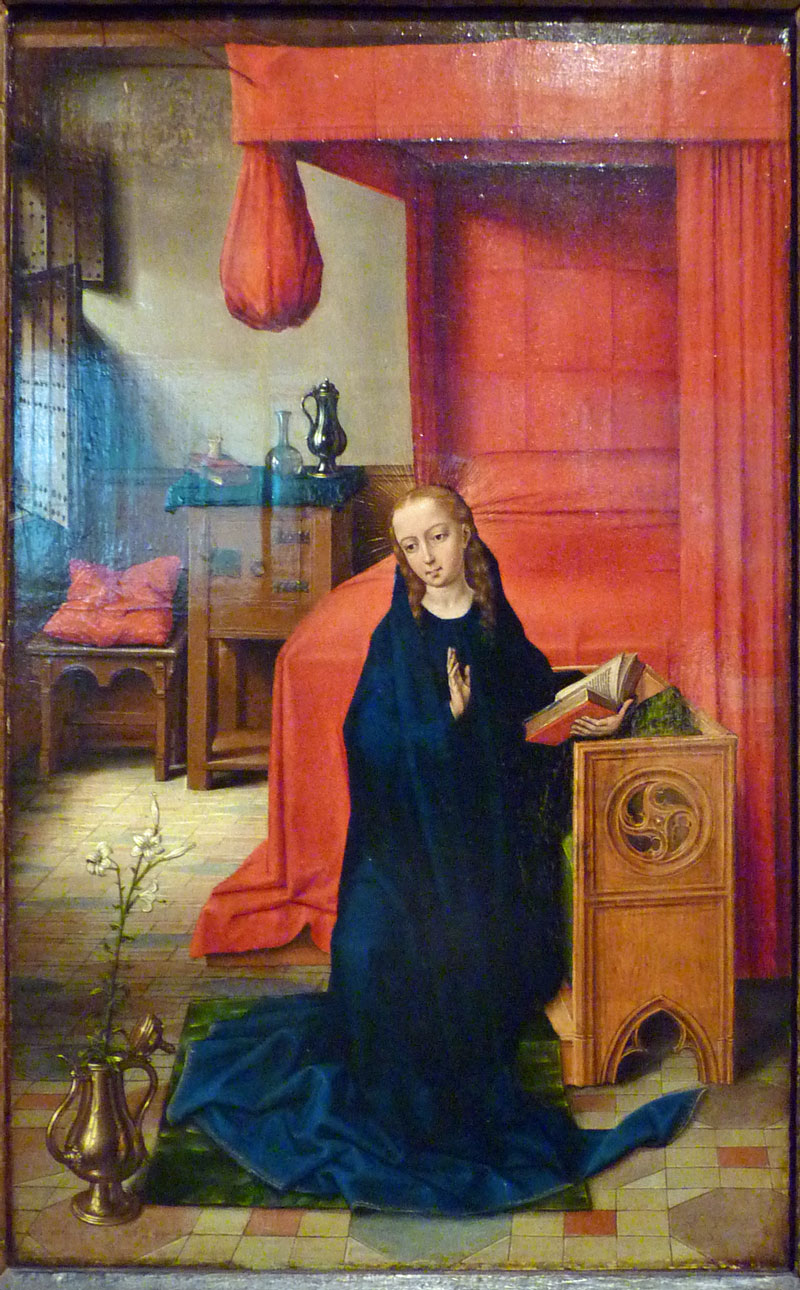
Virgin Annunciate. Utmost left wing of a triptych. Burrell Collection, Glasgow.

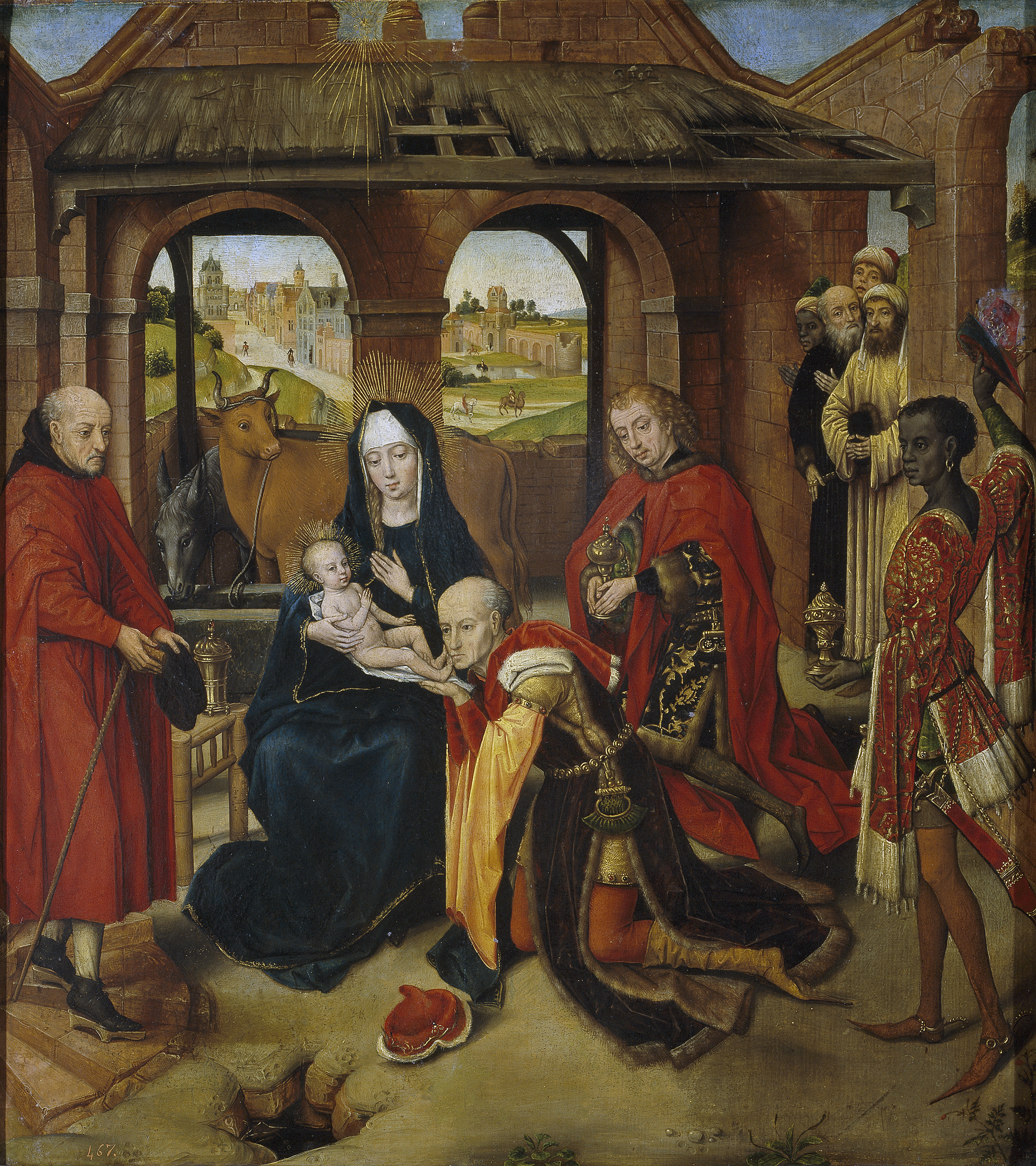
Adoration of the Magi. Central panel. Prado

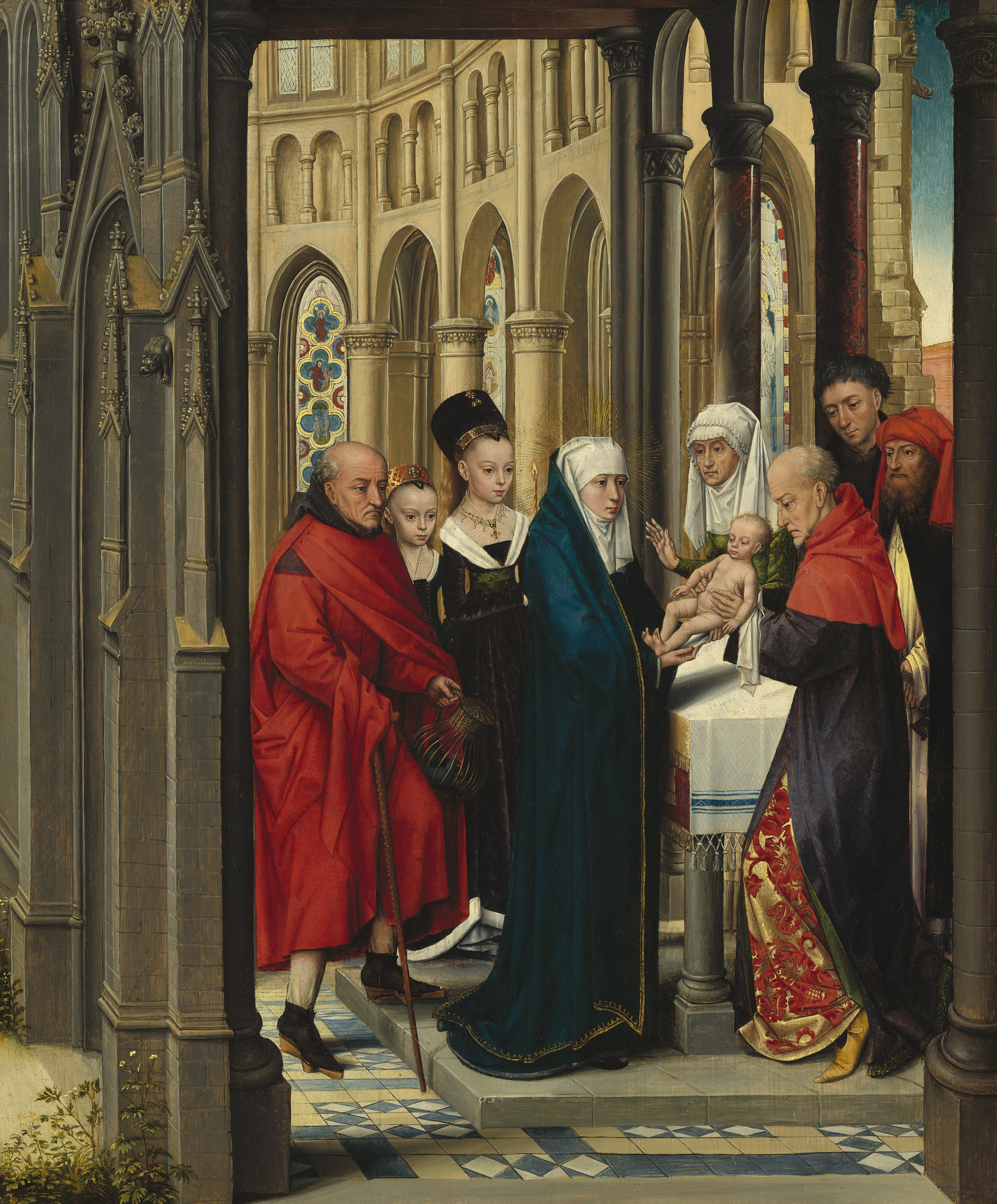
Presentation in the Temple, Oil on panel, 57.9 x 47.8 cm. National Gallery of Art, Washington D.C.

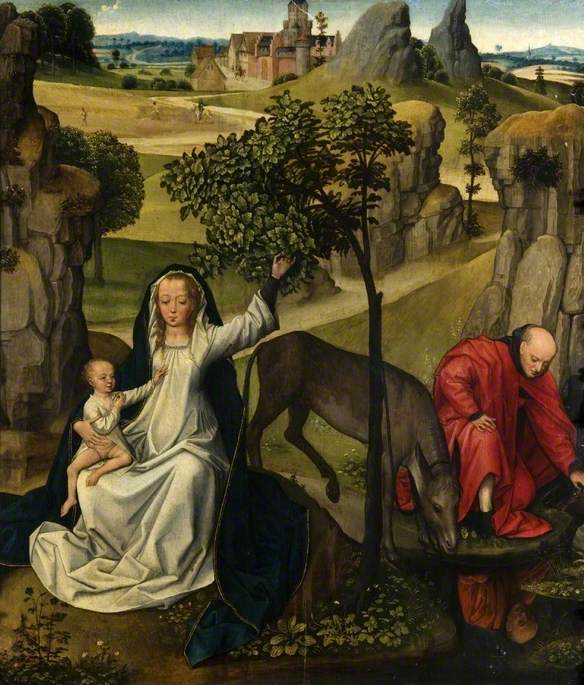
The Flight into Egypt
