= Phiale Painter =

Ancient Attic-Greek vase-painter

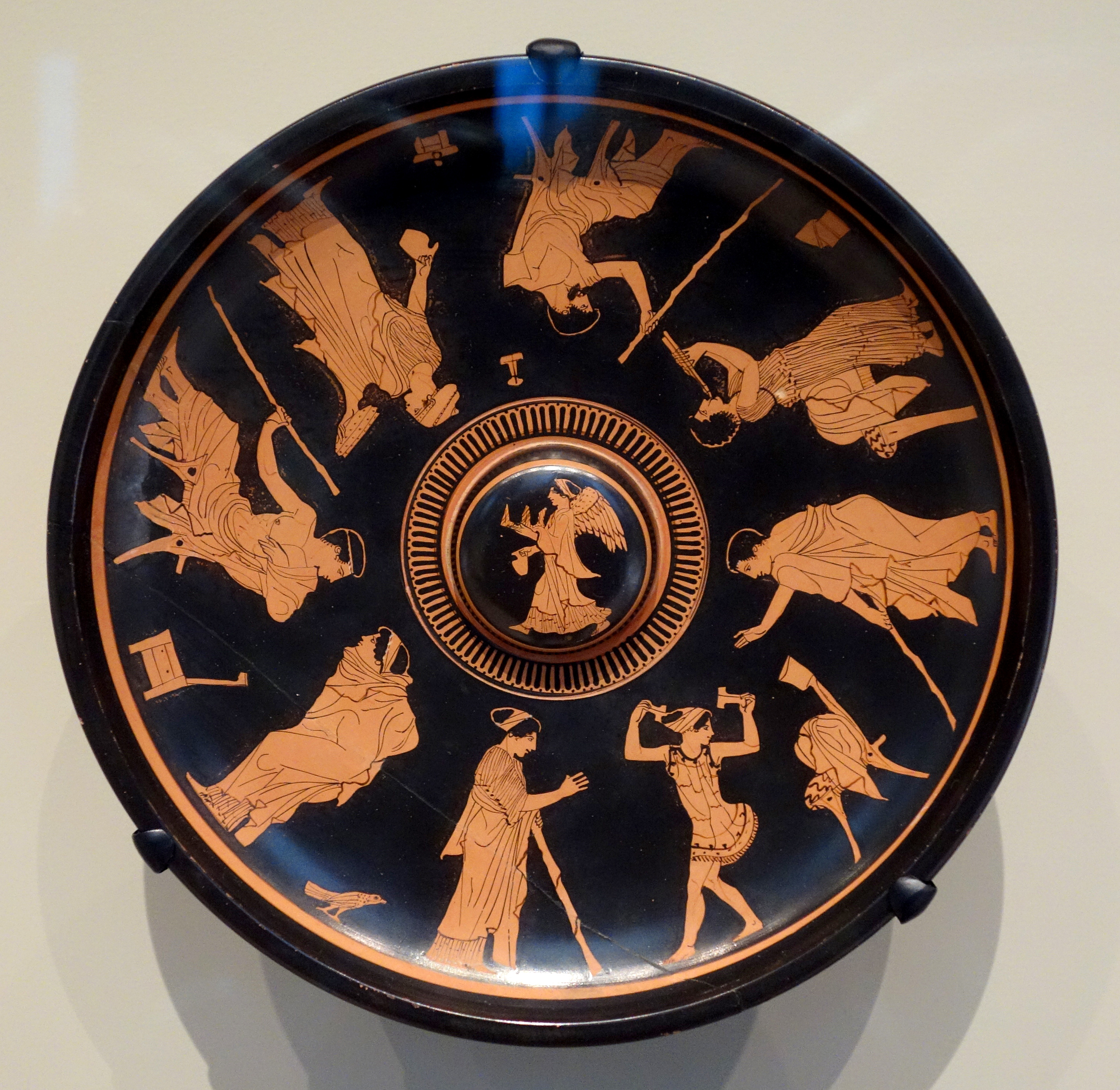
Red-figure phiale by the Phiale Painter, ca. 430 B.C. (Museum of Fine Arts, Boston)

The Phiale Painter, also known as Boston Phiale Painter, was a painter of the Attic red-figure style. He was active around 460 to 430 BC. The Phiale Painter is assumed to have been a pupil of the Achilles Painter. In contrast to his master, he liked to depict narrative scenes. He painted several large calyx kraters, often with two registers of figures; unlike his master, he seems to have preferred larger vessels in general. This is shown by his white-ground works, which are not well known, but more expressive than those of the Achilles Painter. Apart from a number of lekythoi, he painted two chalice kraters in white-ground technique, a rarity at the time. His themes may be partially influenced by contemporary theatre. His preferred name for kalos inscriptions is that of Euaion, son of Aeschylus.

The Phiale Painter was named by John Beazley for a red-figure phiale with scenes of men entertained by a group of women, now in the Museum of Fine Arts, Boston.

== Bibliography ==
- Beazley, J. D. Attic Red Figure Vase Painters, 2nd edition. Oxford: Clarendon Press, 1963.
- Boardman, J. Athenian Red Figure Vases: The Classical Period. London: Thames and Hudson, 1989, pp. 61–62.
- Oakley, J. H. The Phiale Painter (Kerameus 8). Mainz am Rhein: Philipp von Zabern, 1990.
