= Aschbach, Bas-Rhin =

Aschbach Àschbàch
- Commune
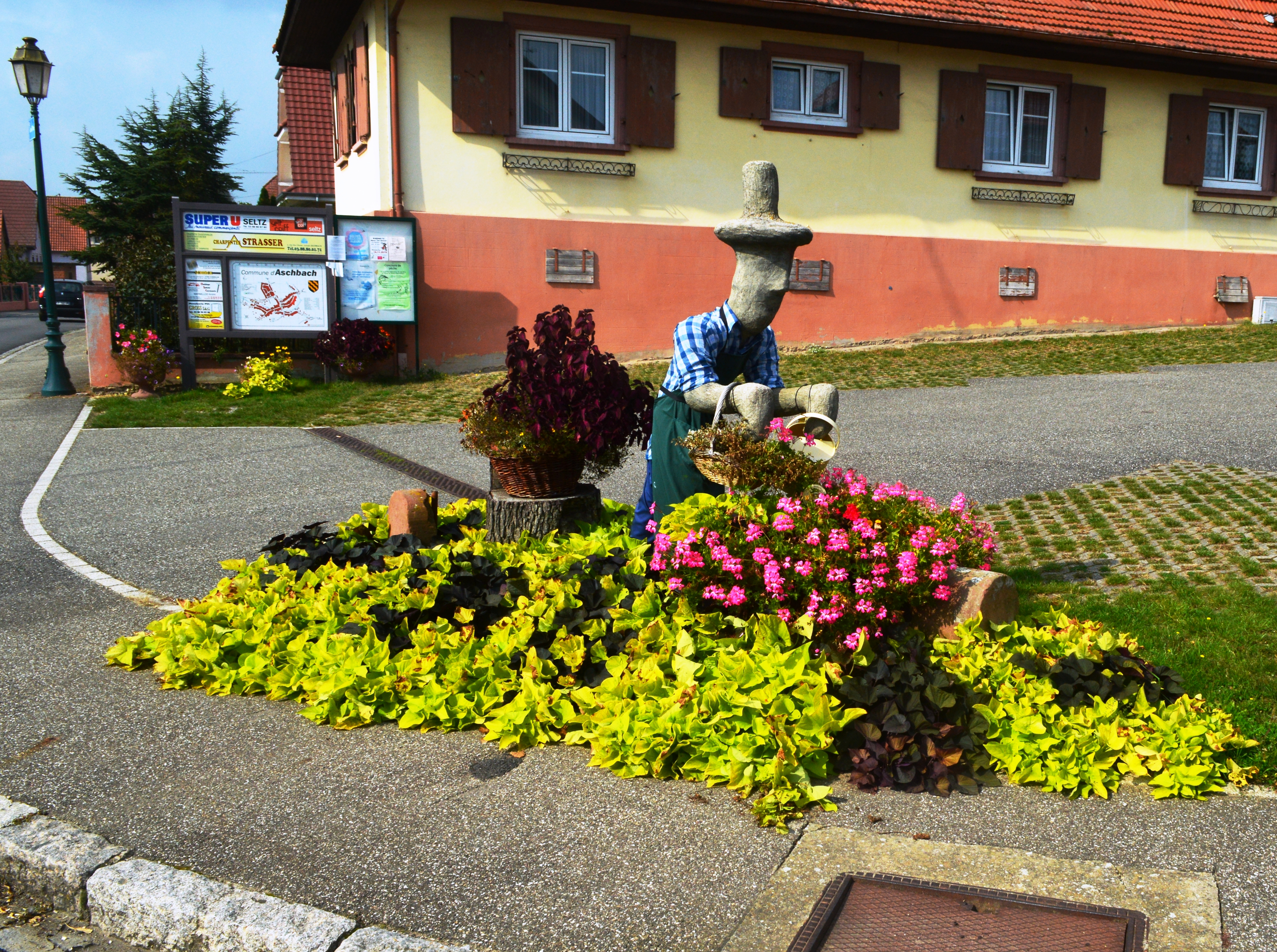
- Street Art in Aschbach

- Coat of arms
- Location of Aschbach
- Location within France Location within Grand Est
- Coordinates: 48°56′07″N 7°59′03″E
- Country: France
- Region: Grand Est
- Department: Bas-Rhin
- Arrondissement: Haguenau-Wissembourg
- Canton: Wissembourg
- Intercommunality: CC Outre-Forêt

Government
  - Mayor (2020–2026): Paul Heintz
- Area^{1}: 4.32 km^{2} (1.67 sq mi)
- Highest elevation: 178 m (584 ft)
- Lowest elevation: 137 m (449 ft)
- Population (2023): 633
  - Density: 147/km^{2} (380/sq mi)
- Time zone: UTC+01:00 (CET)
  - Summer (DST): UTC+02:00 (CEST)
- INSEE/Postal code: 67012 /67250
- ^{1} French Land Register data, which excludes lakes, ponds, glaciers > 1 km^{2} (0.386 sq mi or 247 acres) and river estuaries.

Aschbach is a commune in the Bas-Rhin department in the Grand Est region of north-eastern France.

== Geography ==
Aschbach is located some 13 km south by south-east of Wissembourg and 8 km east of Soultz-sous-Forêts. Access to the commune is by the D245 road from Stundwiller in the south passing through the village and continuing north to Seebach. With exception of a small band of forest on the western border the commune is entirely farmland.

The Seebach river forms the eastern border of the commune as it flows south to join the Seltzbach at Buhl. An unnamed stream rises in the centre of the commune and flows south-east through the village to join the Seebach on the south-eastern border.

== History ==
In the 14th century Aschbach was the property of the Diocese of Speyer (Germany). Under the Ancien Régime Aschbach, Stundwiller, and Oberroedern formed the Superior Court with their church at Stundwiller. These three villages were merged in 1974 but Aschbach was separated again in 1988.

According to the cadastral plan of 1839 there were buildings built close together and also other places which were marshlands. The school was built in 1833, an oratory at a place called Kreutzfeld dates to 1864, and the church was built in 1871.

The village suffered terrible damage in the Second World War and reconstruction gave the village a new look with a larger and more open built-up area. The presbytery was built in 1950.

=== Heraldry ===
Arms of Aschbach	Blazon: Sable, three bends wavy of Or.

== Administration ==
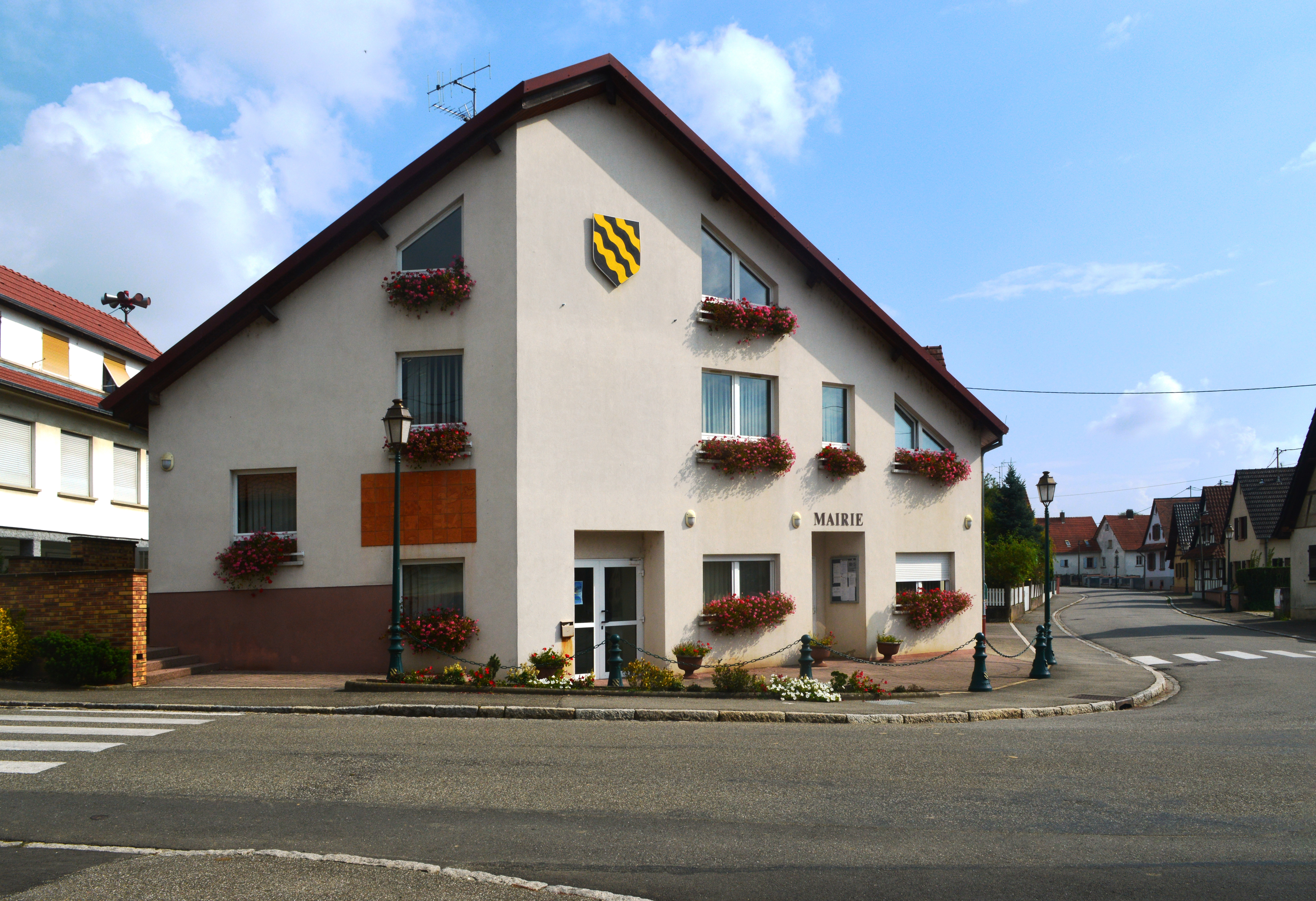
The Town Hall

List of Successive Mayors

From	To	Name
2001	2014	Gérard Strasser
2014	2026	Paul Heintz

== Demography ==
The inhabitants of the commune are known as Aschbachois or Aschbachoises in French.

Historical population

Year	Pop.	±% p.a.
1793	307	—
1800	602	+10.10%
1806	649	+1.26%
1821	780	+1.23%
1831	871	+1.11%
1836	820	−1.20%
1841	736	−2.14%
1846	772	+0.96%
1851	745	−0.71%
1856	649	−2.72%
1861	661	+0.37%
1866	647	−0.43%
1871	679	+0.97%
1875	663	−0.59%
1880	647	−0.49%
1885	581	−2.13%
1890	578	−0.10%
1895	568	−0.35%
1900	574	+0.21%

Year	Pop.	±% p.a.
1905	545	−1.03%
1910	578	+1.18%
1921	590	+0.19%
1926	557	−1.14%
1931	535	−0.80%
1936	527	−0.30%
1946	496	−0.60%
1954	503	+0.18%
1962	513	+0.25%
1968	570	+1.77%
1975	560	−0.25%
1982	563	+0.08%
1990	528	−0.80%
1999	590	+1.24%
2007	679	+1.77%
2012	677	−0.06%
2017	682	+0.15%
2023	633	−1.23%

Source: EHESS and INSEE

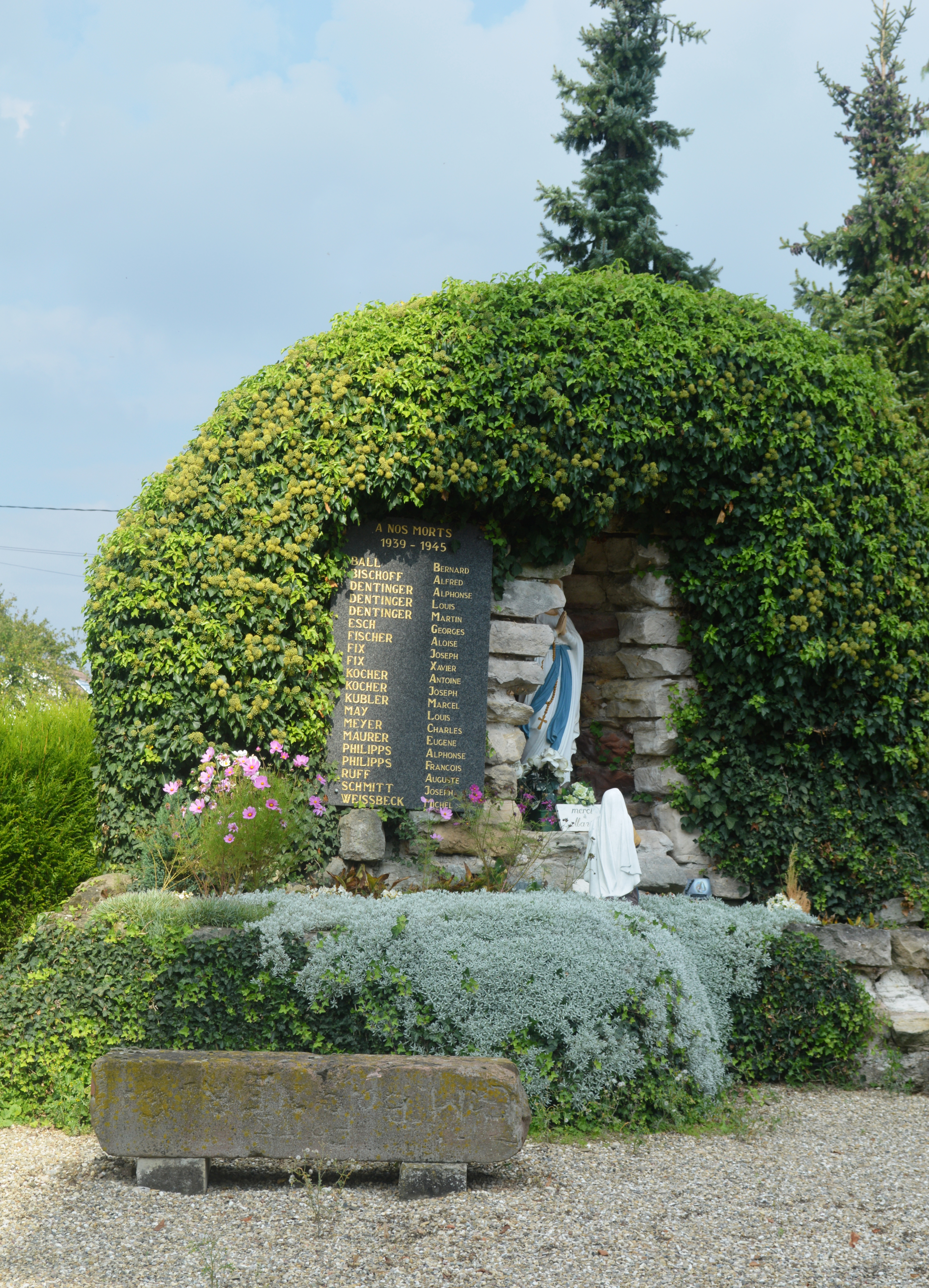
Aschbach War Memorial

== Sites and monuments ==
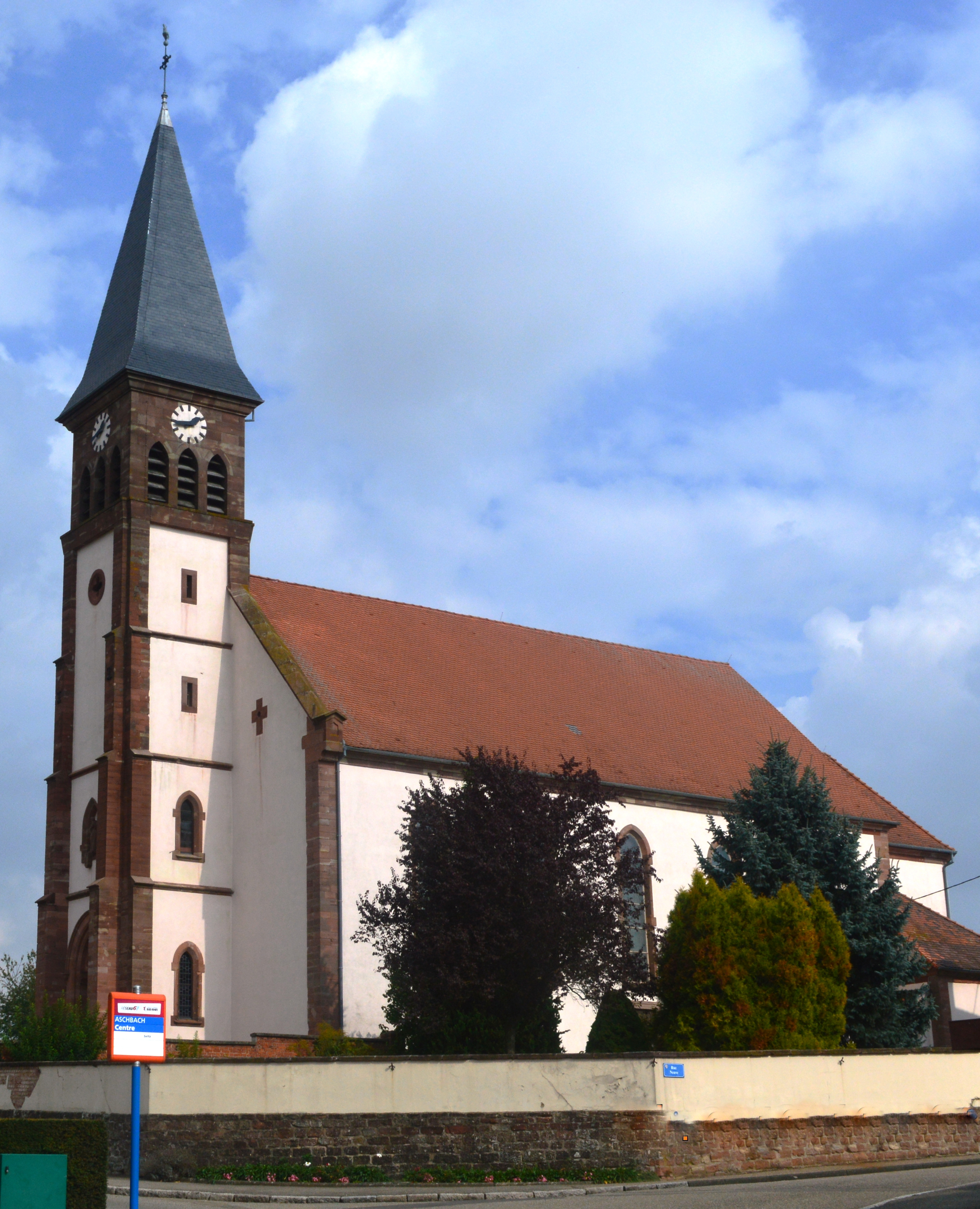
The Church of the Immaculate Conception

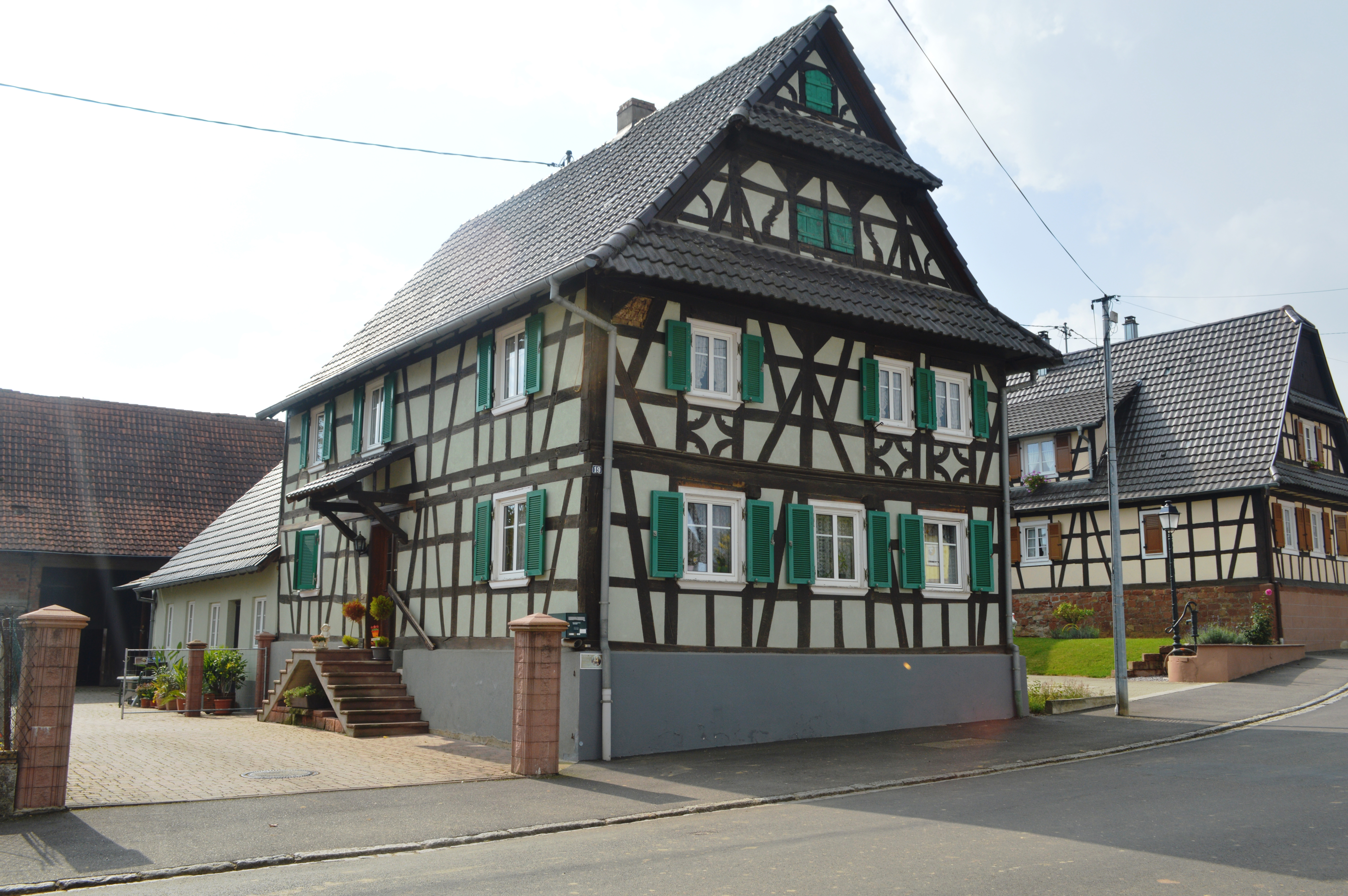
The Farmhouse at 19 Grand Rue

Aschbach has four registrations as historical monuments. These are:

- Parish Church of the Immaculate Conception (1871, 1908, 1928)
- Farmhouse at 19 Grand Rue (18th-20th century)
- House and Farms (18th and 19th century)
- The Village (14th century)

The Church of the Immaculate Conception has many items which are registered as historical objects. These are:

- 2 Monstrances (around 1871)
- Monstrance (around 1871)
- Cross: Christ on the cross (around 1871)
- Painting: Saint Joseph with the child Jesus (around 1871)
- 10 Statues of Saints (around 1871)
- Pulpit, 2 Confessionals, Baptismal fonts (around 1871)
- 3 Altars, 3 Tabernacles, 3 Retables, church stall, half-height panelling (main altar, altar tombstone, secondary altar) (around 1871)
- Furniture in the Church
- Wayside cross: Christ on the cross at Hohlacker (1809)

=== Aschbach Picture Gallery ===
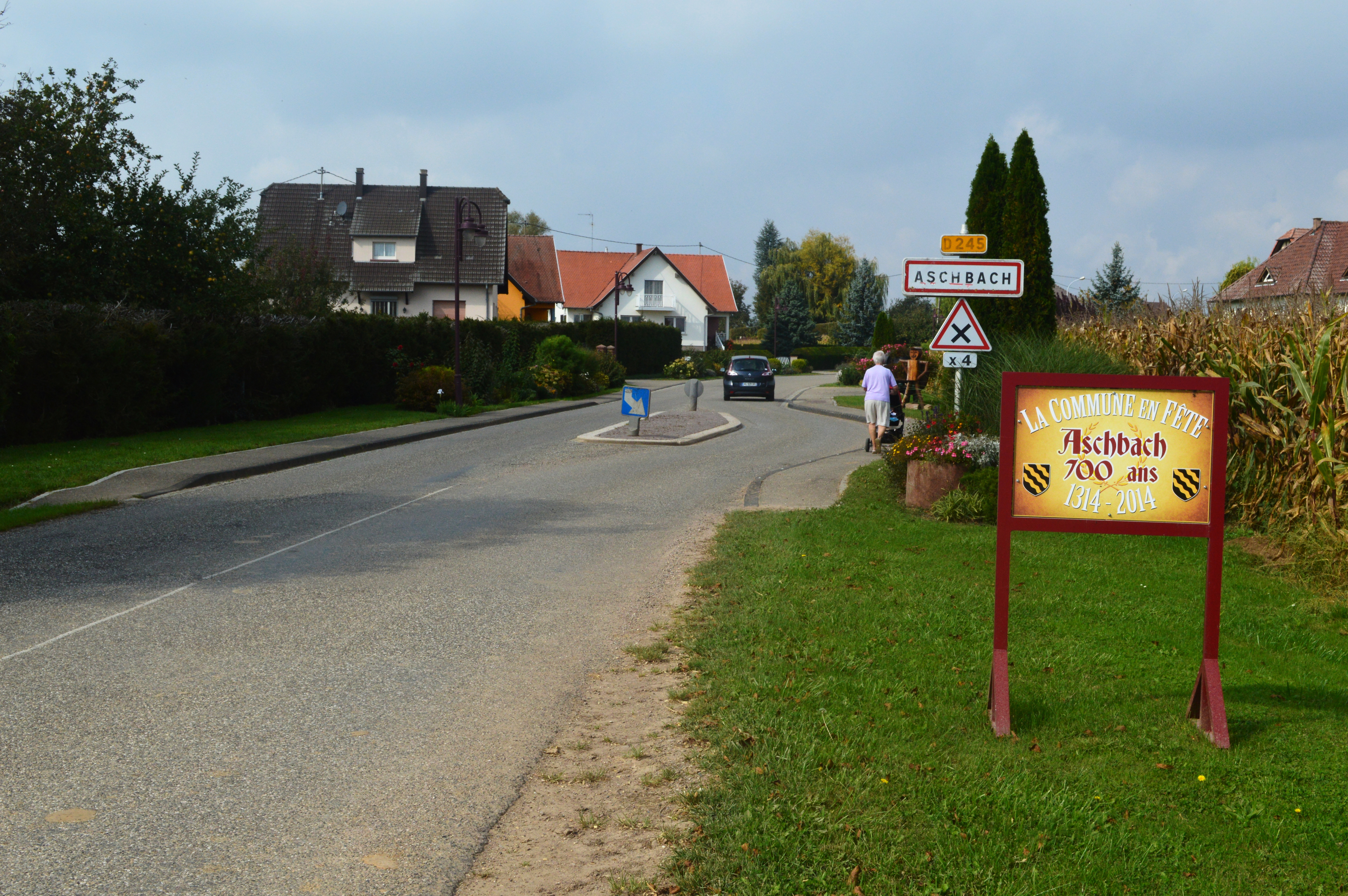
The entry to Aschbach

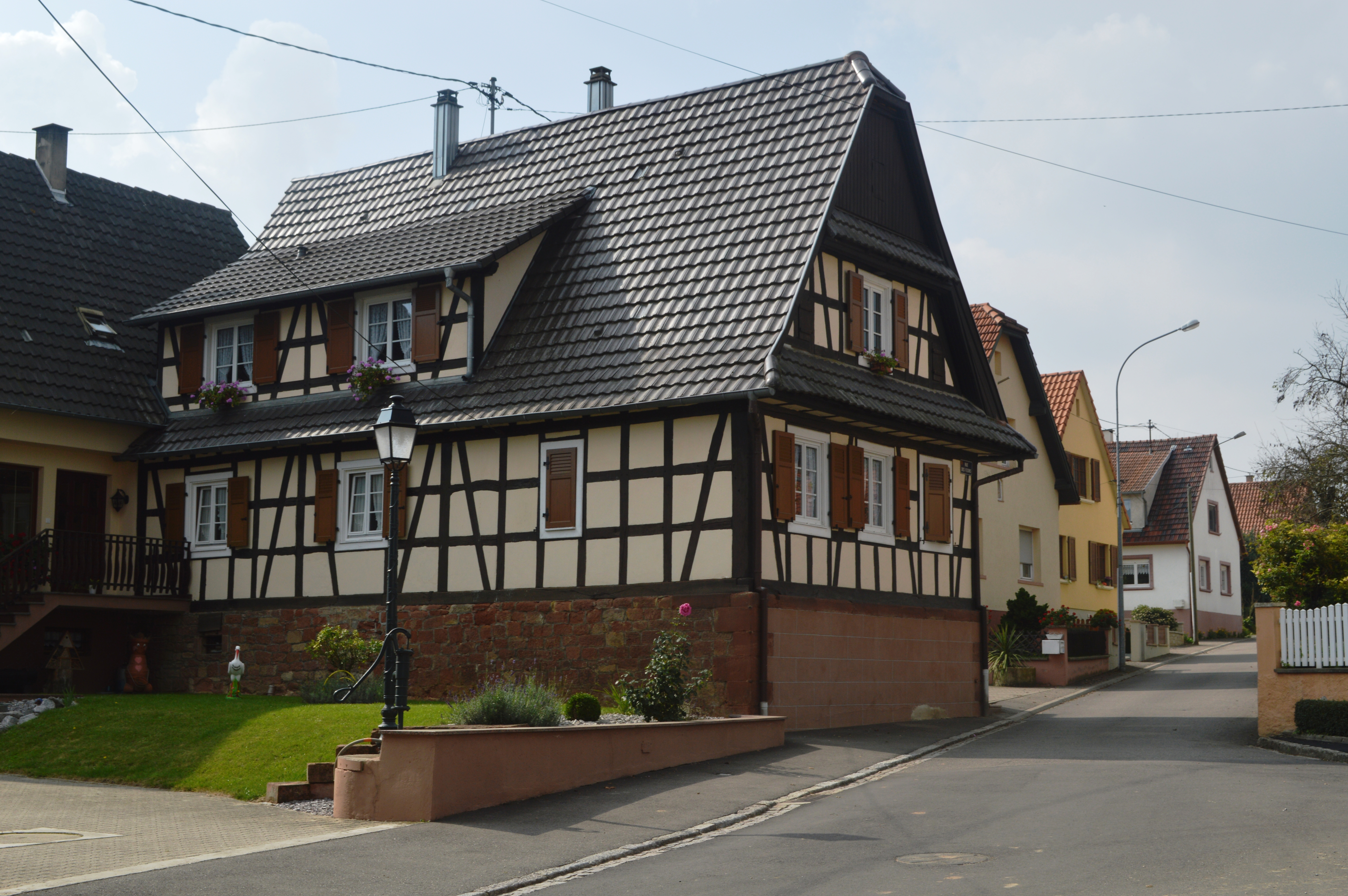
An old house in Aschbach

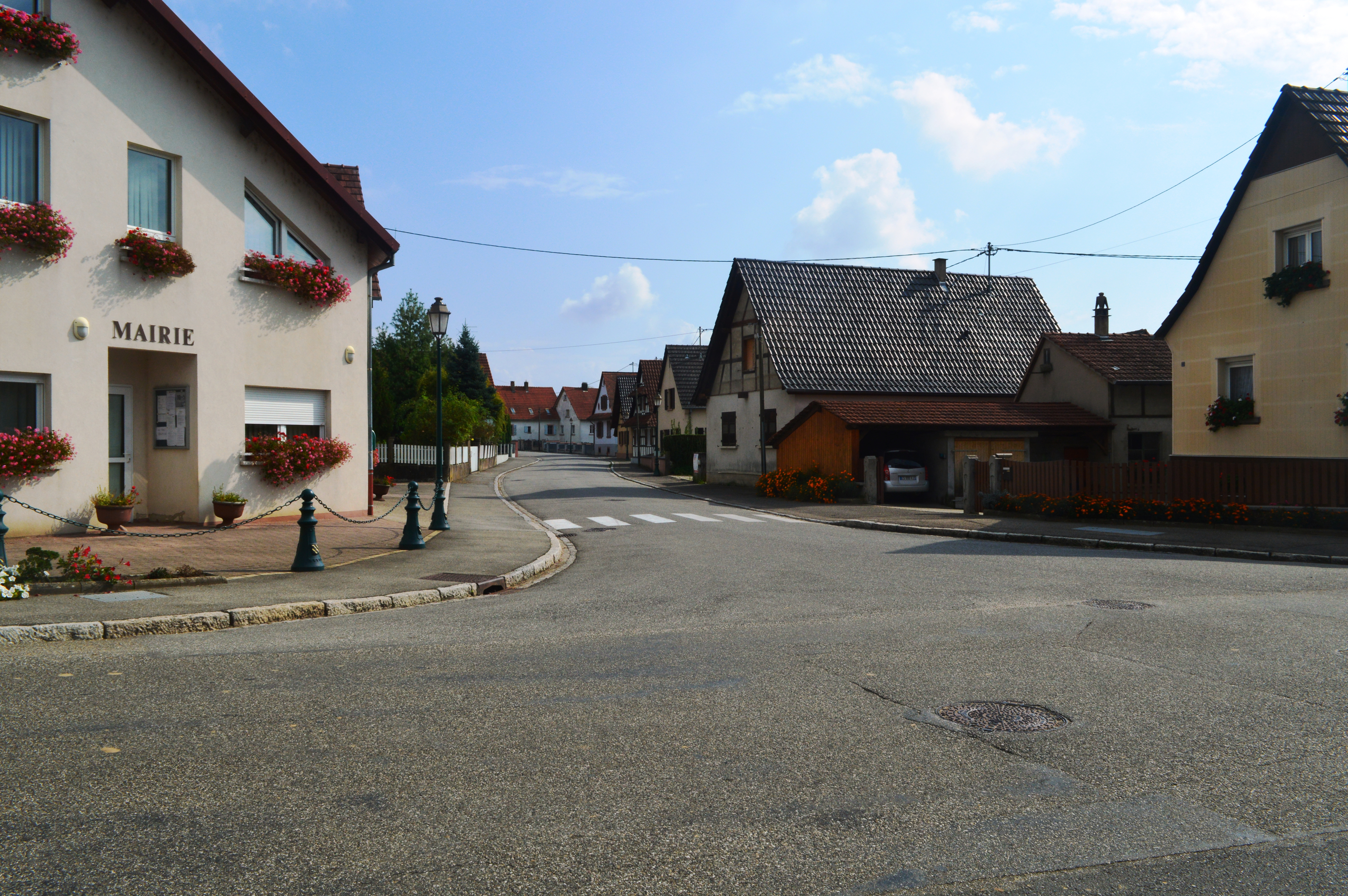
A street in Aschbach

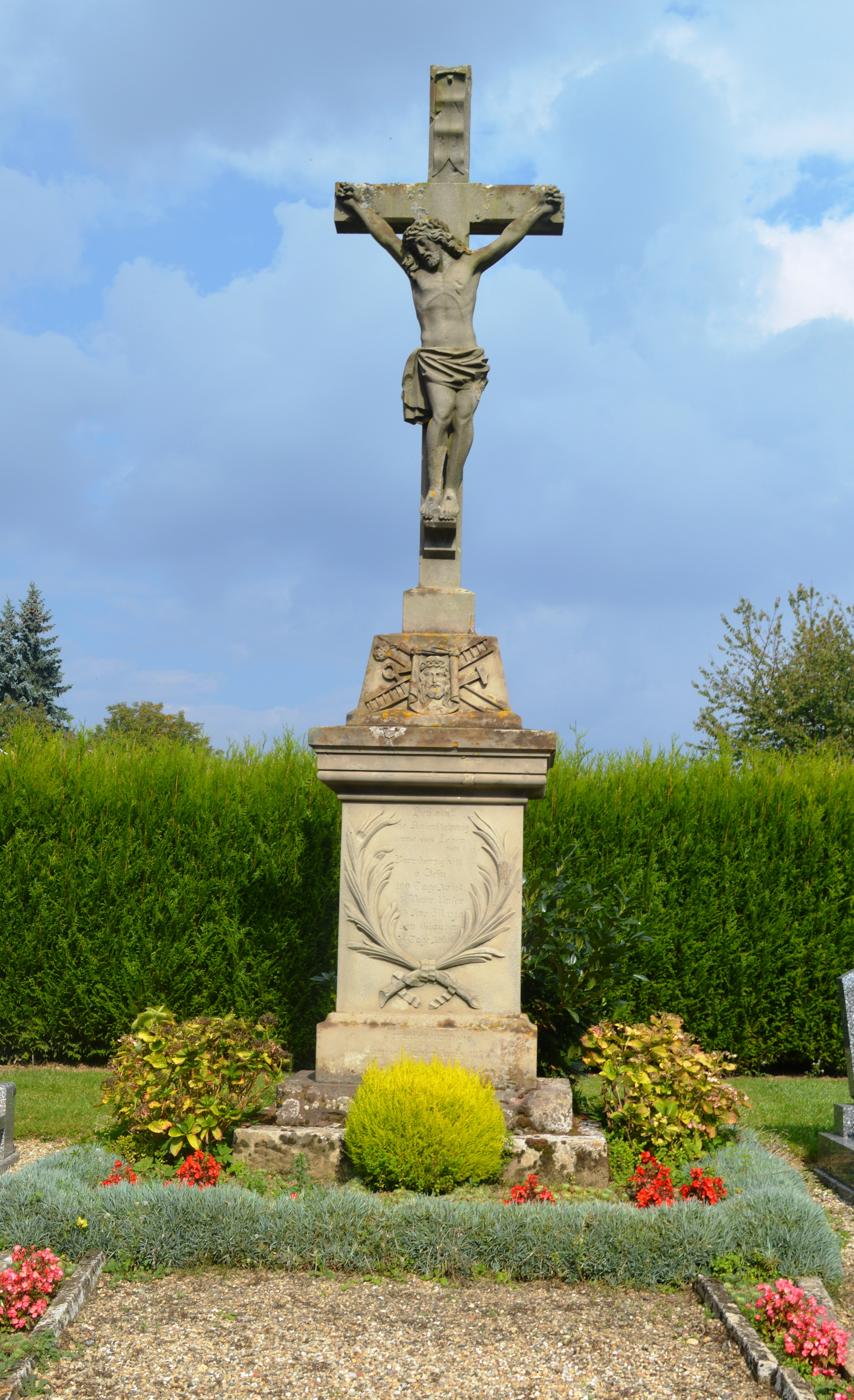
The Wayside Cross

Inside the Church

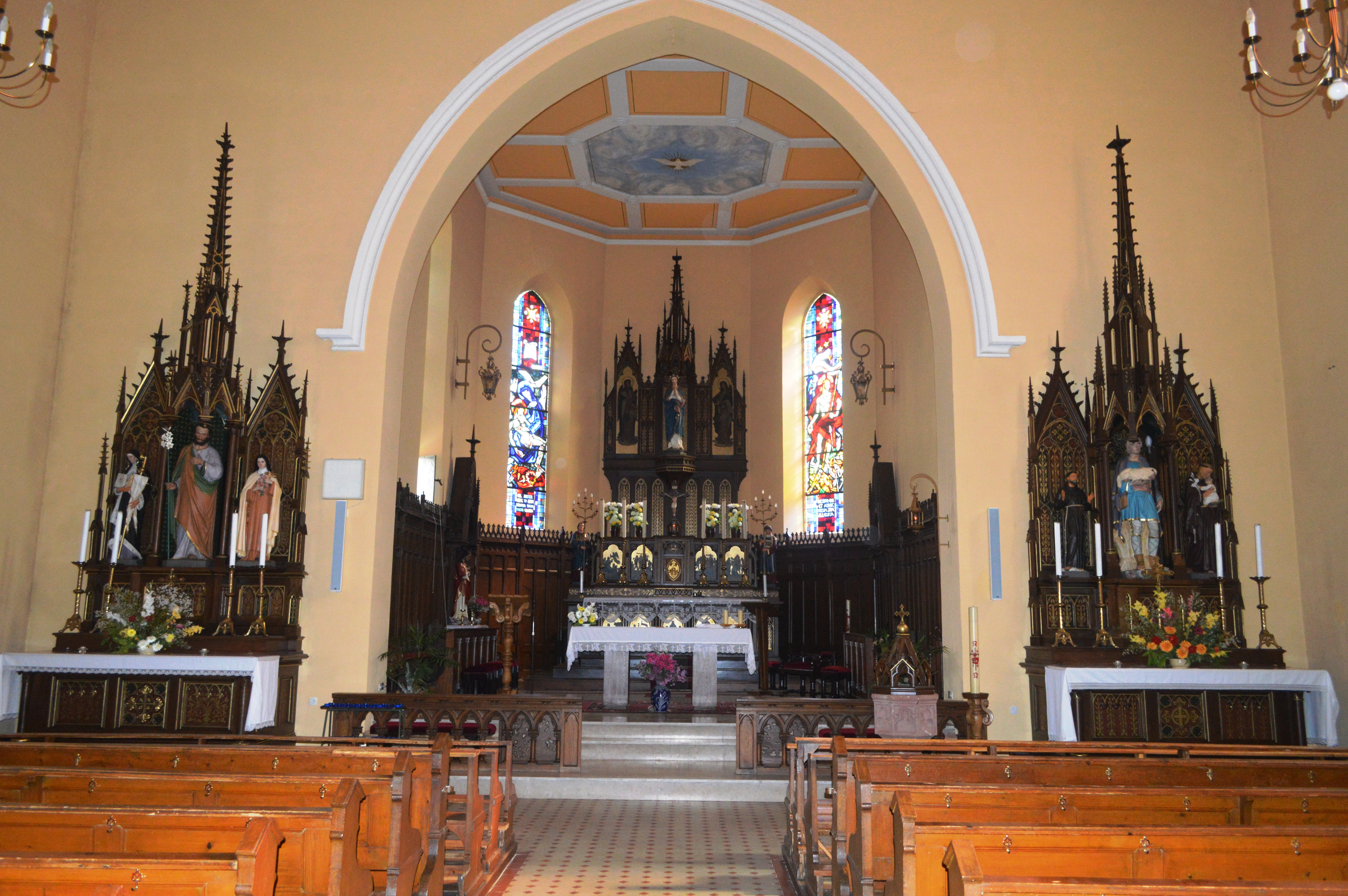
Church Interior

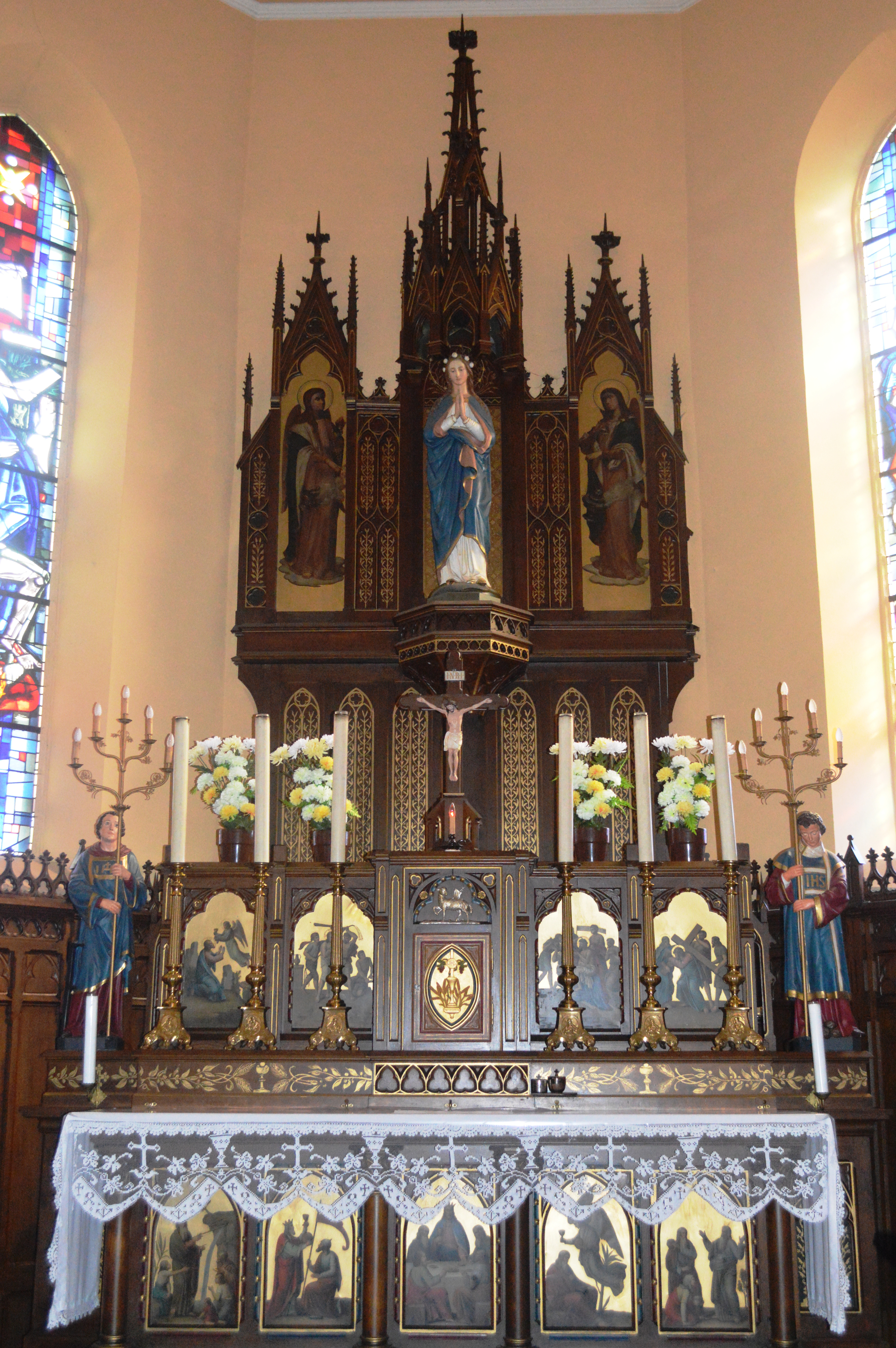
The Main Altar

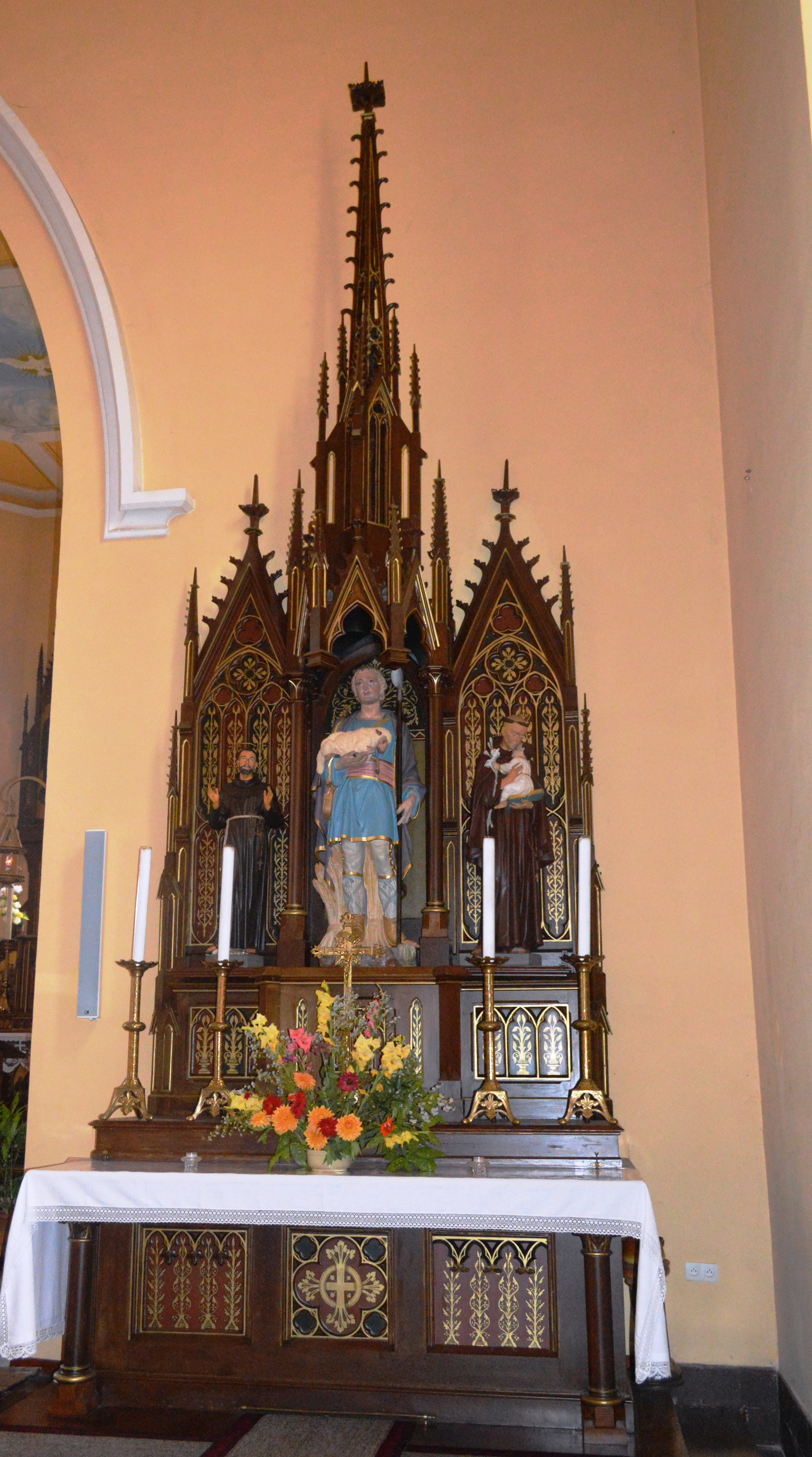
The Secondary Altar

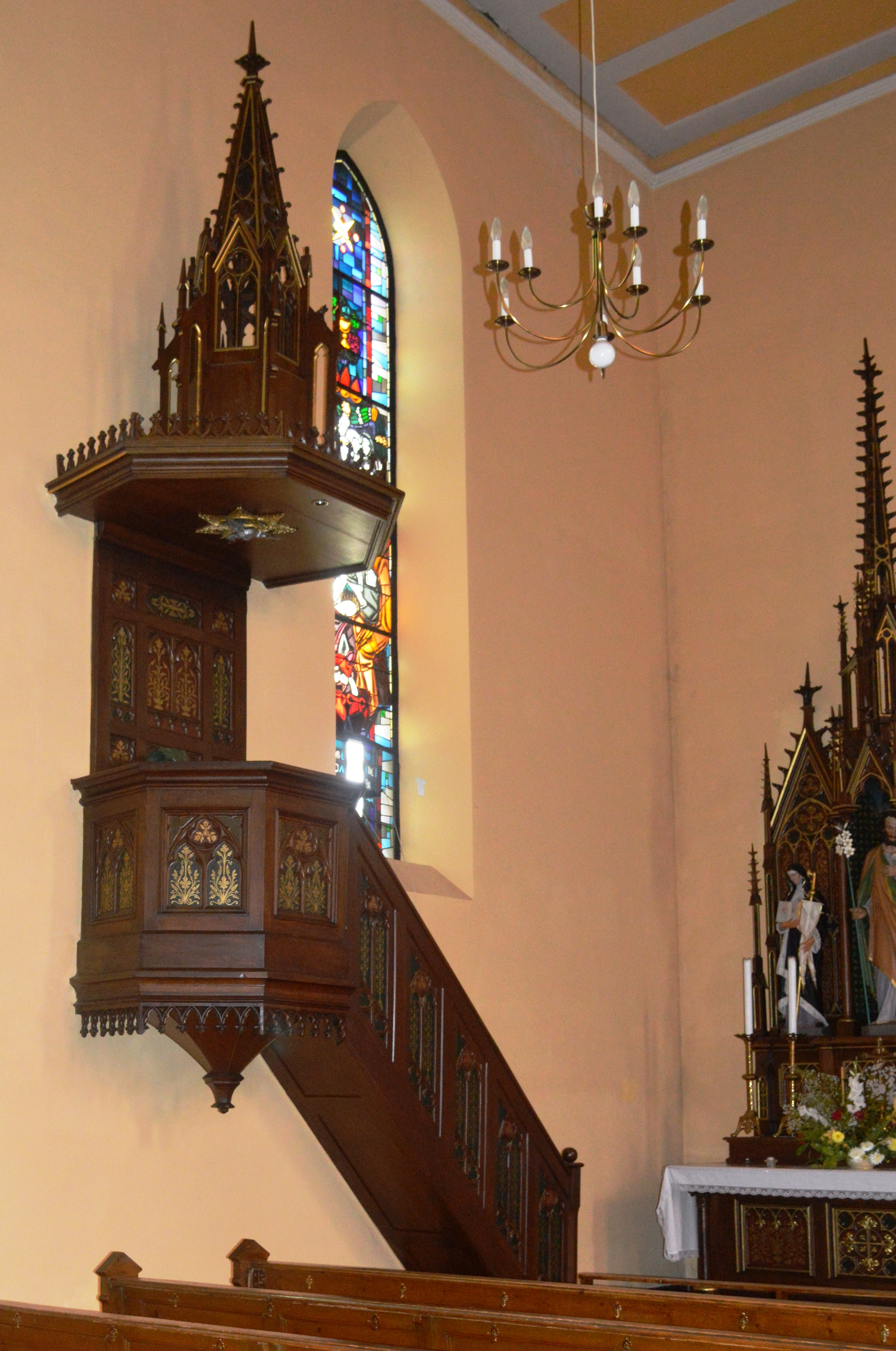
The Pulpit

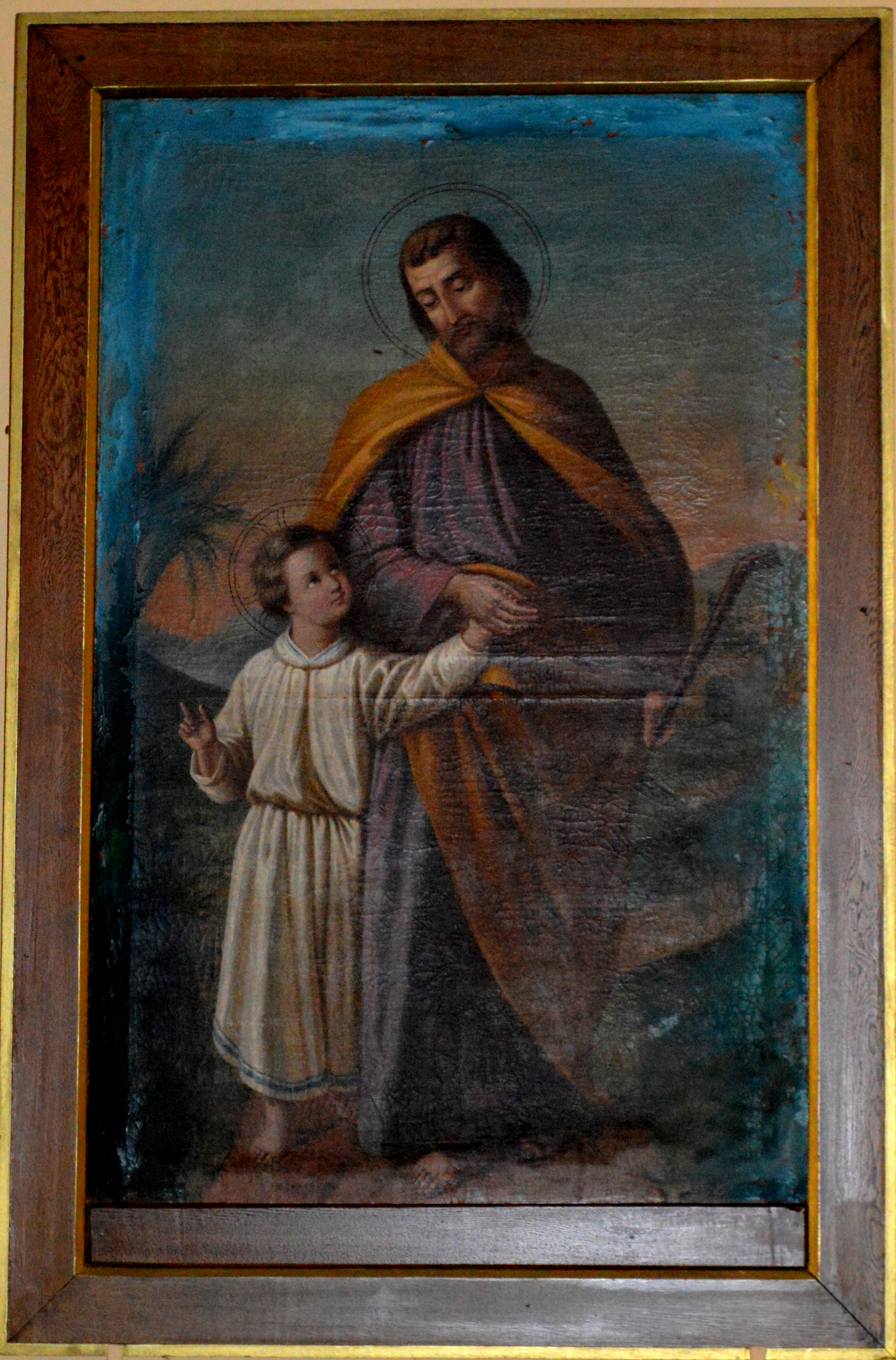
Painting of Saint Joseph with the child Jesus

== See also ==
- Communes of the Bas-Rhin department
