= Master of the Coronation of the Virgin =

Master of the Coronation of the Virgin may refer to:

- The Master of the Coronation of the Virgin, a French sculptor active c. 1200, to whom a tympanum relief of the Coronation of the Virgin at Chartres Cathedral is attributed
- The Master of the Coronation of the Virgin (Paris), a manuscript illuminator active in Paris c. 1400
- The Master of the Coronation of the Virgin, a 15th-century Italian fresco painter

Other anonymous artists with conventional names referring to a painting of the Coronation of the Virgin include:

- The Master of the Arte della Lana Coronation, an Italian painter – a Notname coined by Bernard Berenson in 1963
- The Master of the Bellpuig Coronation, a 14th-century painter active in Catalonia, possibly identified with Ferrer Bassa
- The Master of the Biella Coronation, a 16th-century Italian artist
- The Master of the Carminati Coronation, a 15th-century Italian painter, possibly identified with Antonio di Cristoforo Orsini
- The Master of the Christ Church Coronation, a 14th-century Italian painter
- The Master of the Eboli Coronation, a 15th-century Italian artist
- The Master of the Innocenti Coronation, a Notname given by Osvald Sirén in 1914/1915 to a 15th-century artist otherwise known as the Master of the Bargello Tondo
- The Master of the Landeron Coronation, a 15th-century Swiss painter
- The Master of the Montefalco Coronation, a 15th-century Italian artist
- The Master of the Urbino Coronation, an 14th-century Italian artist
- The Master of the Washington Coronation, a 14th-century Italian painter – a Notname coined by Michelangelo Murano in 1969

== See also ==
- List of anonymous masters
