= Ravenelle Painter =

French painter

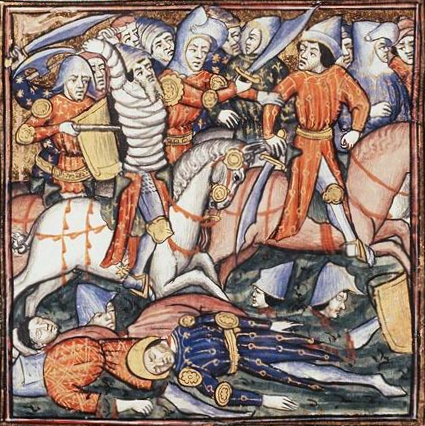
The battle of Cannae, ca 1390–1400. Bibliothèque nationale de France

The Ravenelle Painter, also known as the Master of the Book of Hours of Johannete Ravenelle, the Ravenelle Master or the First Master of the Bible Historiale of Jean de Berry, was a French manuscript illuminator active between 1390 and 1405. Little is known about him. In a 2002 dissertation, Eva Lindqvist Sandgren used stylistic comparison to identify this artist as the illuminator of a book of hours now in the Uppsala University Library, the Ravenelle Hours (MS C 517e). This identification is now widely accepted (for example, by the Bibliothèque nationale de France and the British Library). An earlier notname for the same artist derives from a manuscript of the Bible Historiale, now held by the Bibliothèque nationale de France in Paris, in which he painted several miniatures. The manuscript was once owned by John, Duke of Berry, and with most books containing other work ascribed to the artist seems to have been produced in Paris. This would indicate that the artist lived and worked there, producing large secular works as well as religious treatises written in vernacular French.

== Works ==
The body of work attributed to this master was first defined by Millard Meiss from his contribution to a manuscript of the Bible historiale intended for John, Duke of Berry, his most famous manuscript even though his participation is limited. This manuscript was made in collaboration with the Master of the Coronation of the Virgin, who takes a much larger and more original part. Eva Lindqvist Sandgren's work expanded a proposed corpus to include many works made in Paris around the turn of the 15th century, both individual works and works made in partnership with other illuminators.

== Sources ==
This article incorporates text from a free content work. Licensed under Creative Commons Attribution 4.0 International (CC-BY) > (license statement/permission). Text taken from First Master of the Bible historiale of Jean de Berry, J. Paul Getty Museum.
