= Paolo Veneziano =

Italian painter (1300-1365)

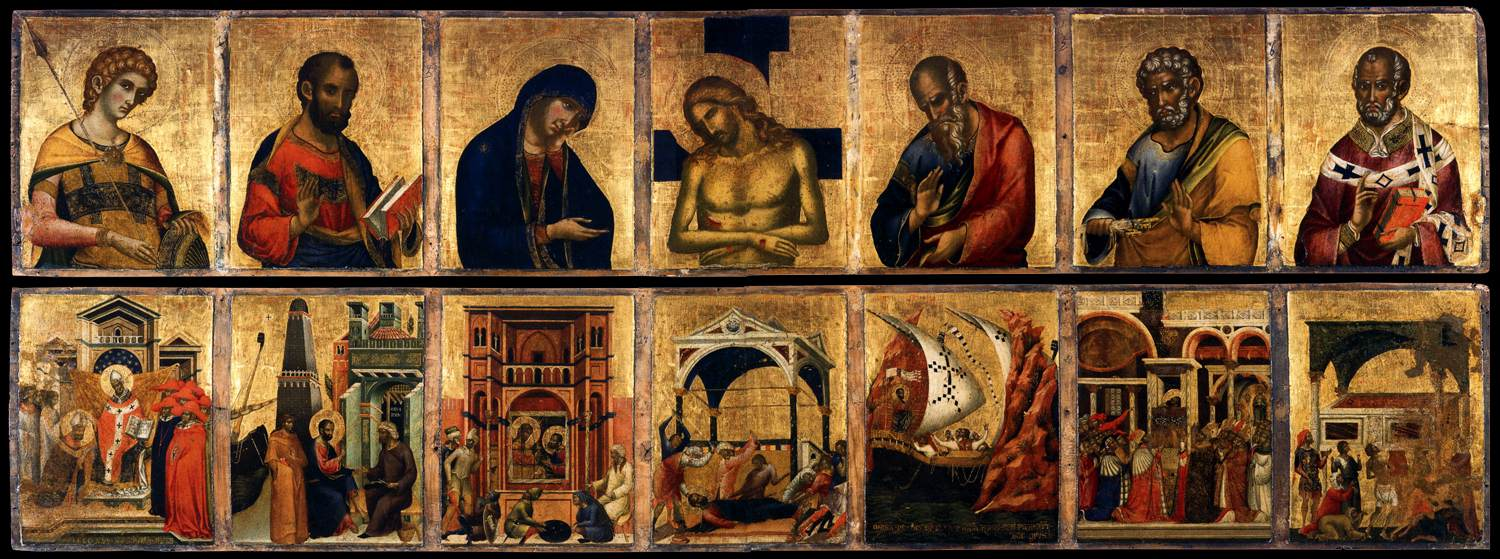
Surviving Panels from the Pala Feriale or “weekday altarpiece”, for the famous metalwork and enamel Pala d'Oro of the St Mark's Basilica, 1345

Paolo Veneziano, also Veneziano Paolo or Paolo da Venezia (active by 1333, died after 1358) was a 14th-century painter from Venice, the "founder of the Venetian School" of painting, probably active between about 1321 and 1362. He has been called 'the most important Venetian painter of the 14th century'. His many signed and dated works, some in collaboration with his sons, range between 1333 and 1358. He was regarded as the official painter of the Venetian Republic.

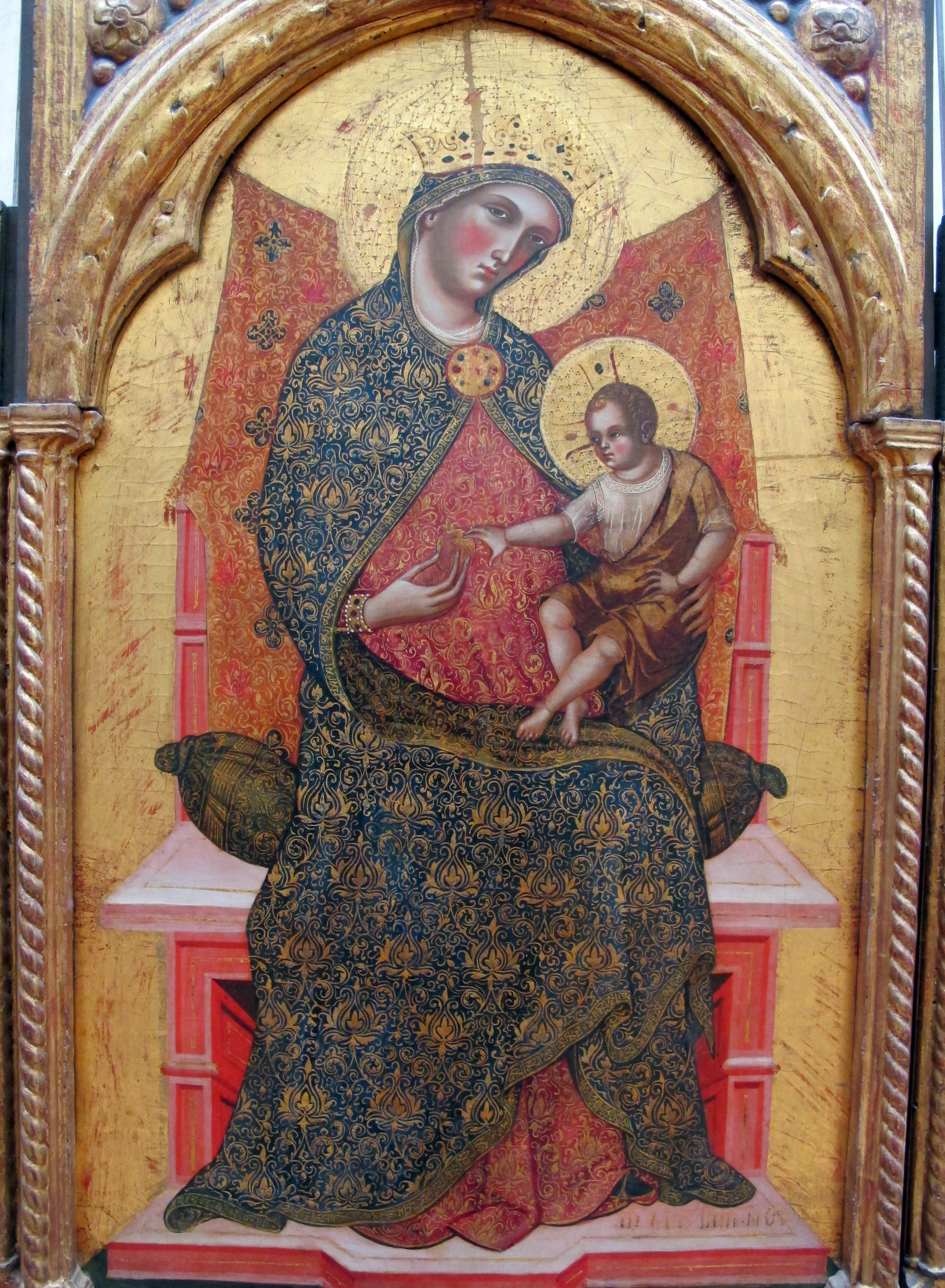
Virgin Mary and Child, central panel of a polyptych, Louvre Museum, 1354.

He led the development in Venice of the elaborately framed polyptych or "composite altarpiece" form, which became popular all over Italy during the 13th century, partly in response to liturgical changes (only reversed in the 20th century) which placed the priest celebrating mass on the same side of the altar as the congregation, so with his back to them for much of the time. This encouraged the creation of altarpieces behind and above the altar, as a visual devotional focus. He is the oldest Venetian painter whose name is known, and the earliest to paint the new subject of the Coronation of the Virgin.

His style is "still Byzantine", that is to say Italo-Byzantine, but increasingly influenced by the Gothic art developing north of the Alps, and personal elements. However, influence from Giotto is "almost entirely absent".

== Life ==
He was born to a family of artists. He operated a large workshop in which he worked together with his sons Marco, Luca, and Giovanni. He was the official painter of Andrea Dandolo, for whom he and his sons Luca and Giovanni painted the Pala Feriale or “weekday altarpiece”, for the famous metalwork and enamel Pala d'Oro of the St Mark's Basilica in Venice, which was only opened on Sundays and feast days. Unfortunately most of the many scenes of these painted covers, probably his most prestigious commission, are now lost.

Paolo was in the past identified with the artist responsible for the works attributed to the Master of the Washington Coronation. There is no longer unanimity among art historians regarding this identification.

== Style ==
Paolo's style was indebted to Byzantine influences but also betrays a knowledge of contemporary painting in Rimini. His more advanced works show the influence of Gothic art. Through his art he was the founder of the Venetian school which would exert its influence throughout the 14th century and in particular on Lorenzo Veneziano, apparently not a relation, but possibly a pupil.

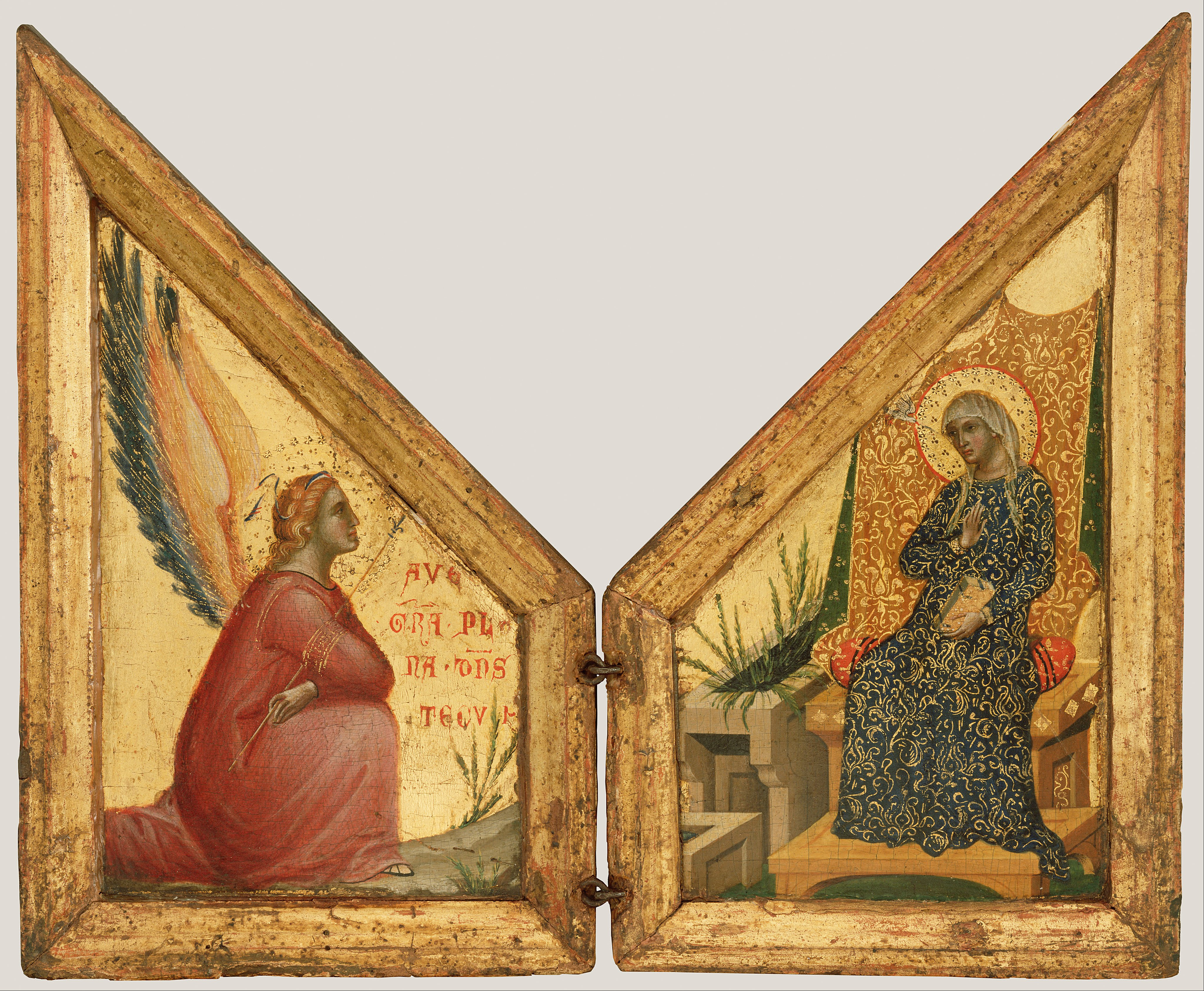
The Annunciation

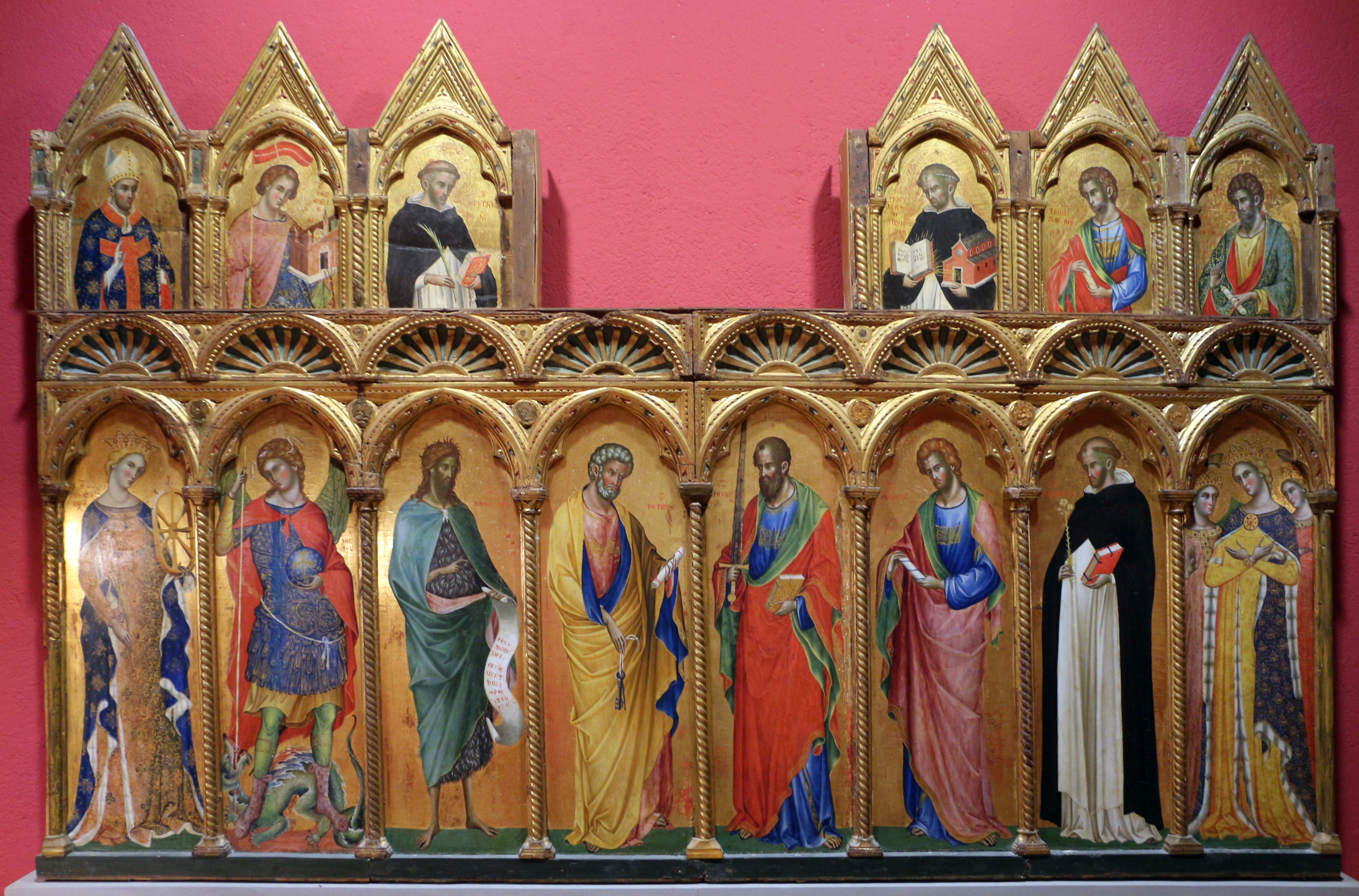
San Severino Polyptych, with Giovannino Veneziano

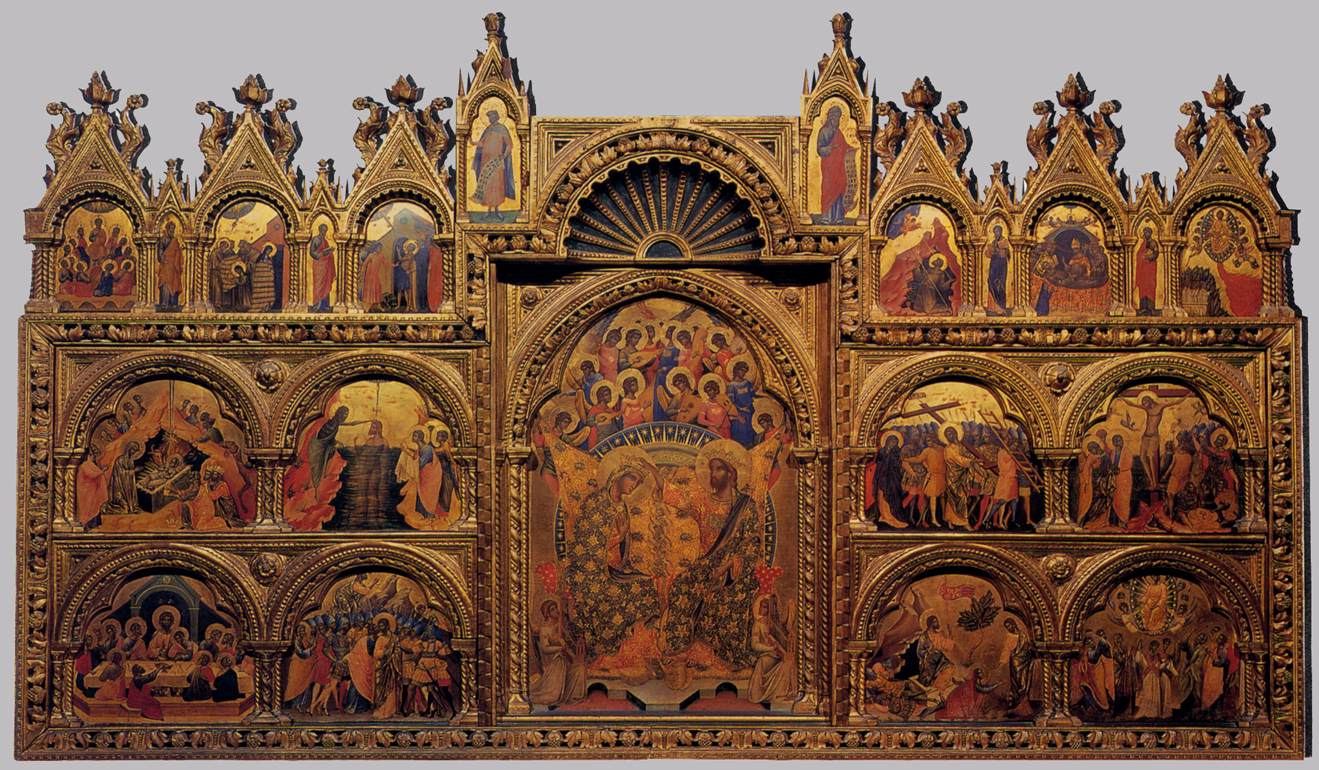
Coronation of the Virgin Polyptych, Gallerie dell'Accademia

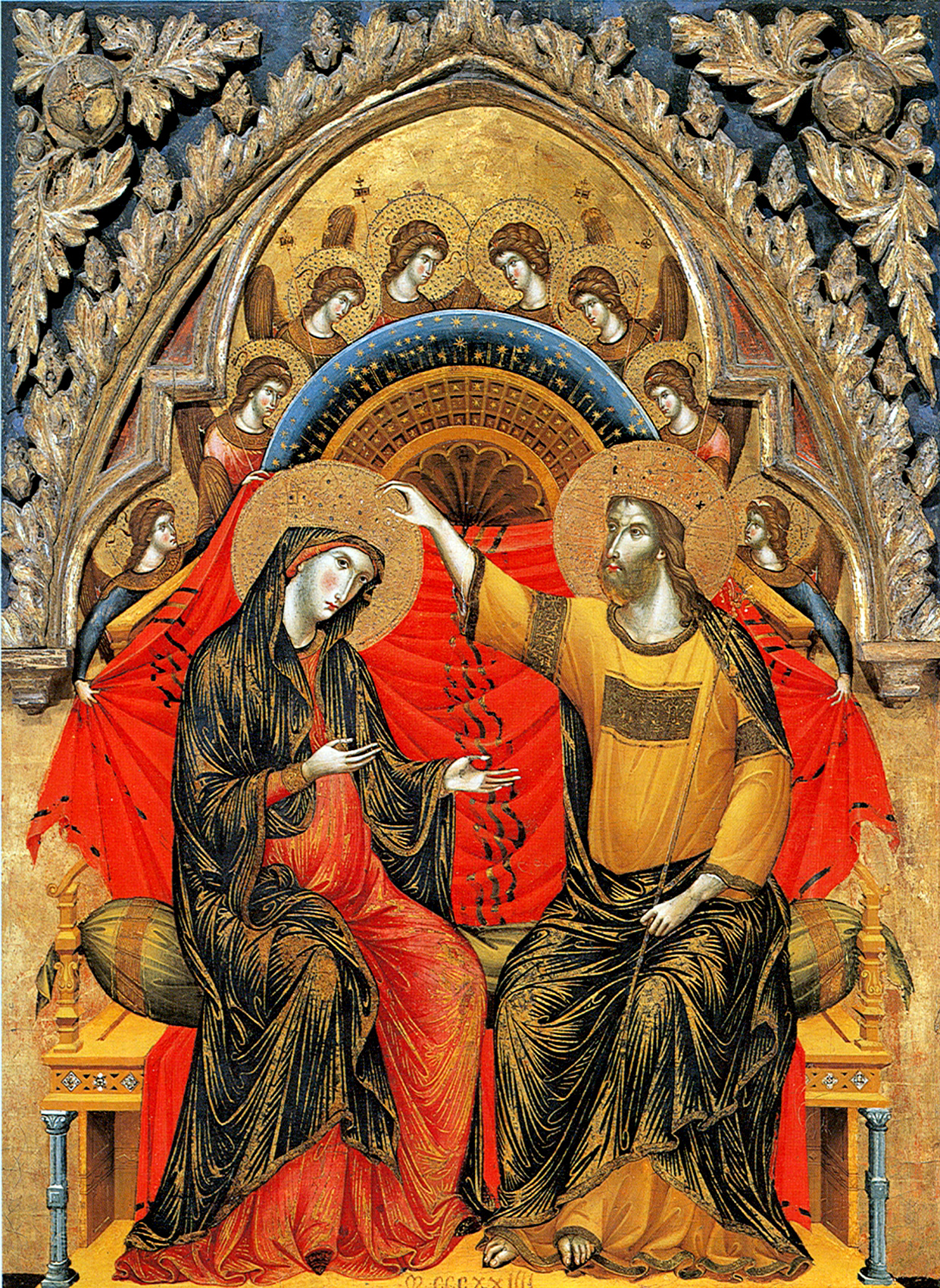
Coronation of the Virgin, National Gallery of Art

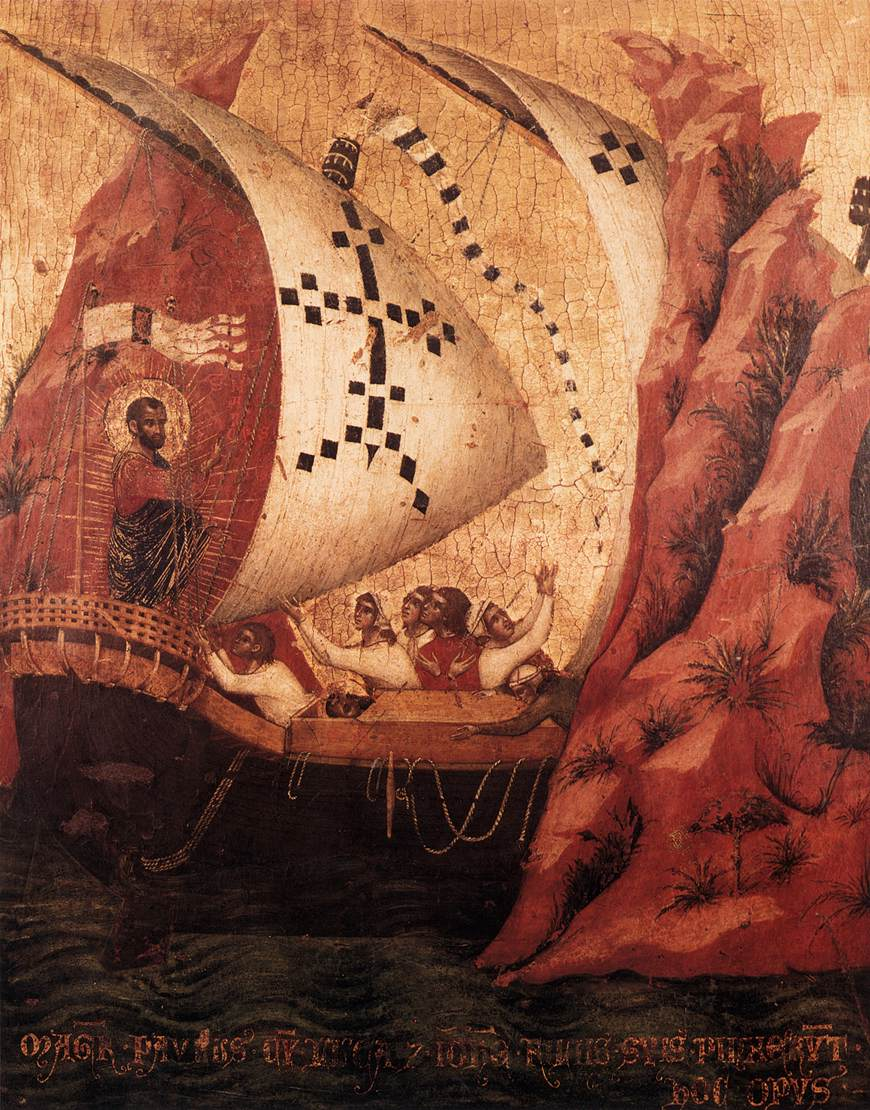
A Scene from the Life of St Mark, from the pala feriale, 1345

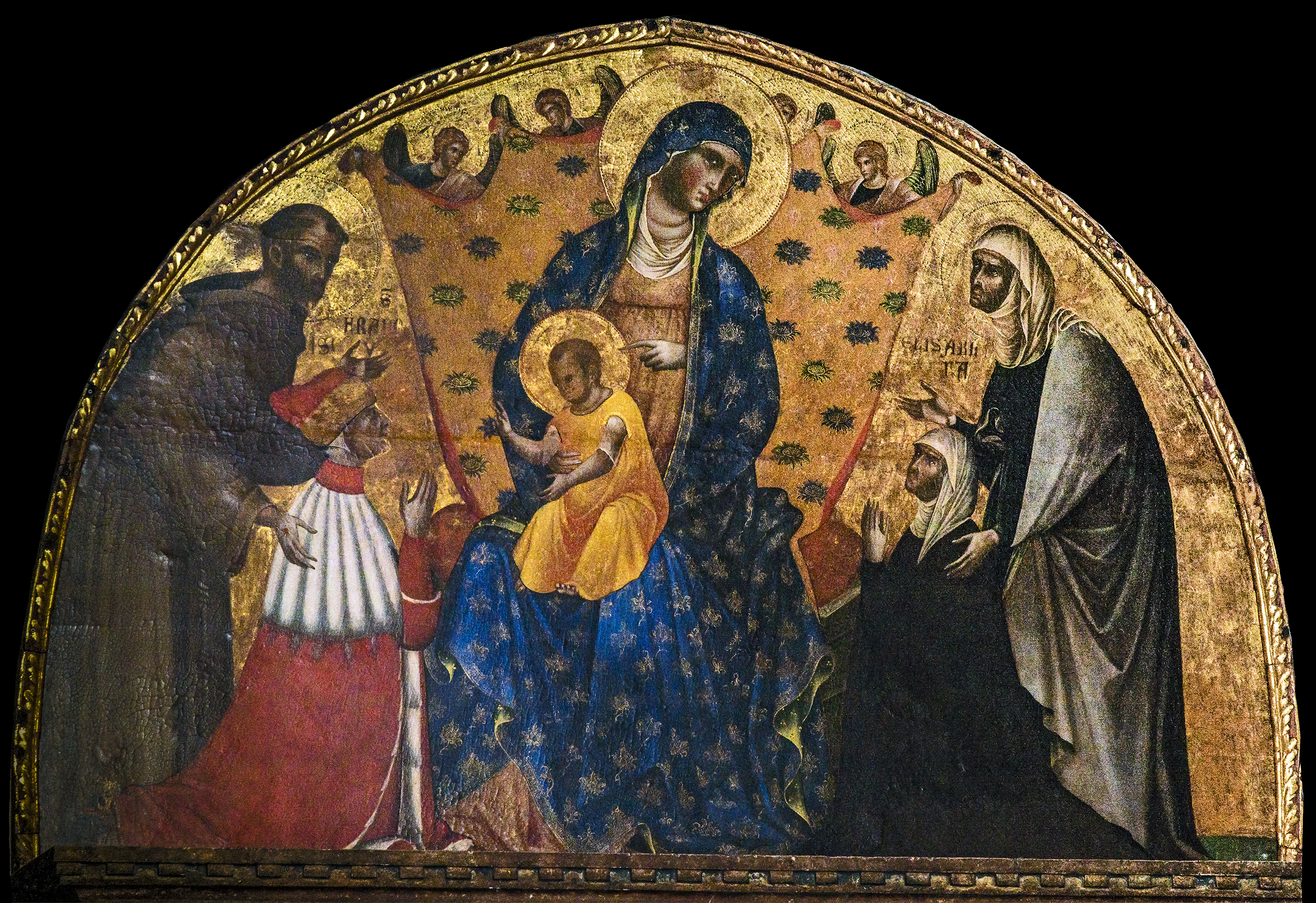
Chapter Room, Santa Maria Gloriosa dei Frari, Monument to Doge Francesco Dandolo, Doge Francesco Dandolo and his Wife Presented to the Madonna

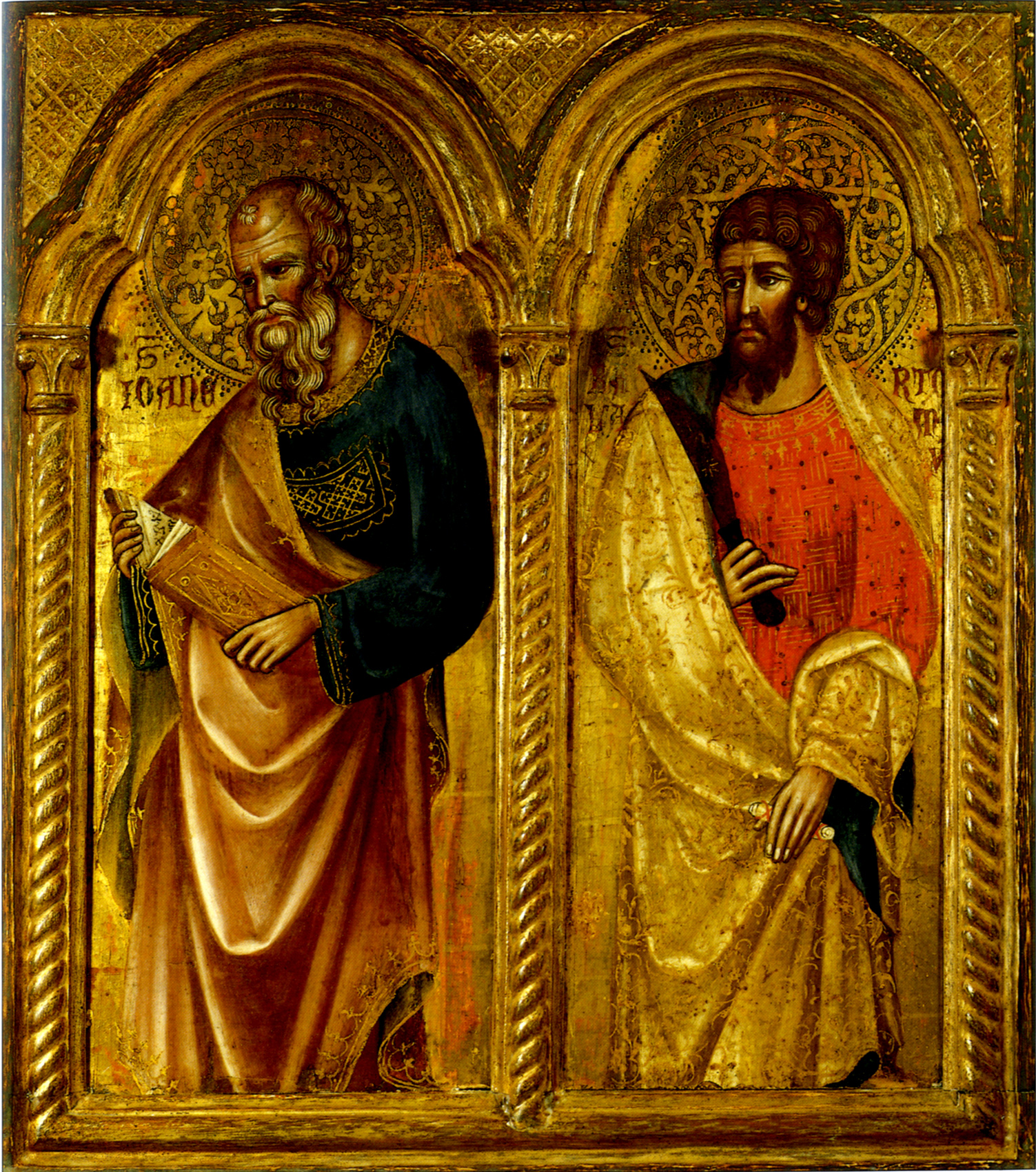
Apostles St James and St Bartholomew, ca.1345, Mimara Museum

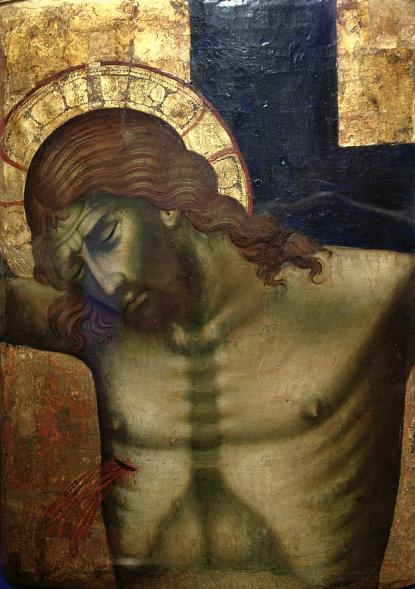
Crucifixion, National Museum in Kraków
