= Ravenelle Hours =

15th-century book of hours

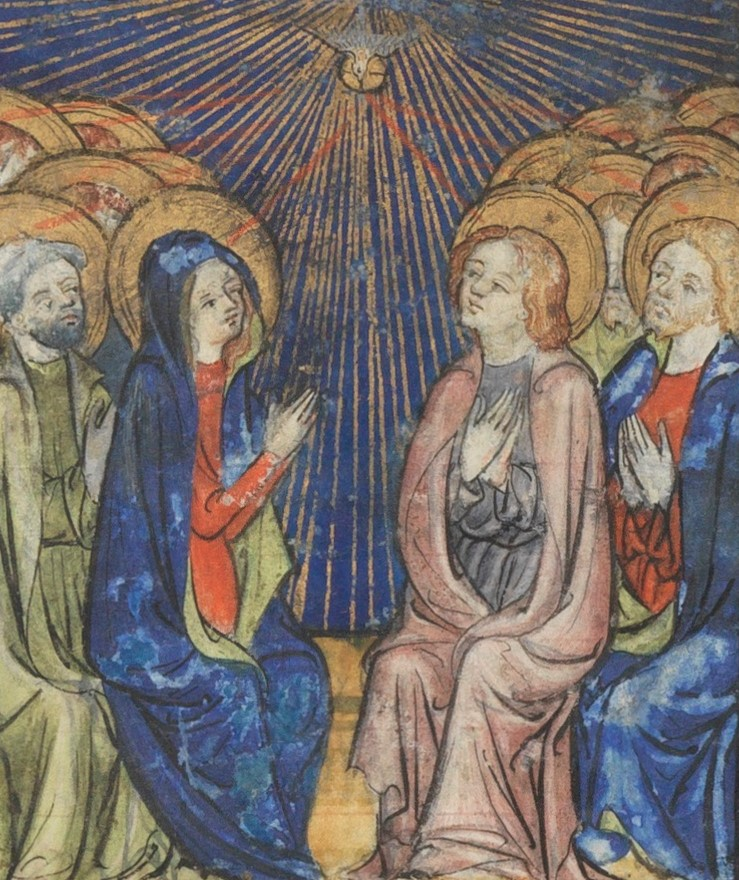
Detail from folio 109 recto of the Ravenelle Hours, showing the miniature depicting Pentecost

The Ravenelle Hours, or the Book of Hours of Johannete Ravenelle (Uppsala, UUB ms C517e), is a 15th-century book of hours made in Paris, France and kept in Uppsala University Library, Sweden. It belonged to Johannete Ravenelle, probably a middle-class woman, and was made by the so-called Ravenelle Painter. It has been dated to 1400–1405. Both stylistically and in subject matter it is a typical representative of books of hours made in Paris at this time. Its decoration includes 14 miniatures as well as other decorative elements. It is not known how the book came to Sweden; it was bought by Uppsala University Library from a private collector in 1953. It is bound in a binding from the turn of the twentieth century.

== History ==
The Ravenelle Hours derives its name from Johannete Ravenelle, whose name appears in one of the prayers in the book. No details are known about her, and the Ravenelle Hours is the only known written source where her name is mentioned. Given the level of decoration of the book, which is generous but not extremely lavish, it has been assumed she came from the middle class. The Ravenelle Hours is in many ways a typical example of a Parisian book of hours from the early 15th century, of a kind which was extensively produced. The book was probably bought in a semi-completed state from a stock supply, and not specifically commissioned for Ravenelle. This is indicated by the fact that some personal prayers, including the one mentioning her name, have been included at a late stage of production and that some of the Latin prayers were originally in the masculine form (intended to be said by a man), but then changed.

The artist who decorated the book is today known by a notname as the Ravenelle Painter; the Ravenelle Hours is the only extant work by the artist with a named patron or owner. The Ravenelle Painter was active in Paris between the last decade of the 14th century and the first decade of the 15th century. The Ravenelle Hours was probably made sometime 1400–1405.

It is not known how the book came to Sweden. It is bound in a Parisian binding from the turn of the twentieth century and must at least temporarily have been in France then. It was bought by Uppsala University Library from a private collector in Gävle in 1953 after being displayed at an exhibition the year before.

== Description ==
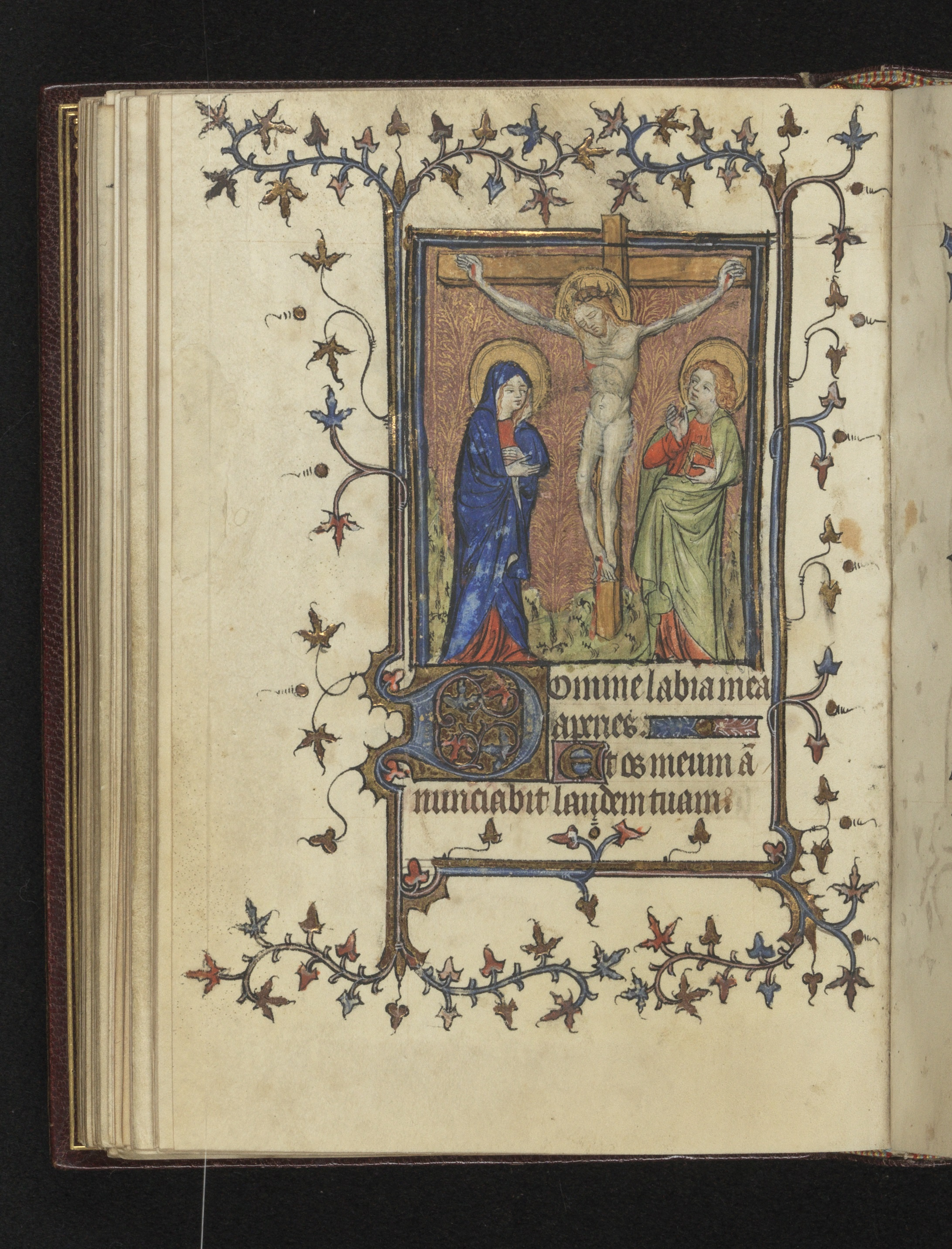
Folio 102v (the Crucifixion)

The Ravenelle Hours is a book of hours, a private devotional book of a type popular during the Middle Ages. It is partially rather worn, showing that it has been used frequently and was not made only for display or ostentation (unlike some more elaborate books of hours). It is written in French and Latin, and structured similarly to many other books of hours made in Paris at the end of the 14th and early 15th century. It contains a calendar with names of saints, the Hours of the Virgin, the Penitential Psalms, the Office of the Dead and several individual prayers.

The Ravenelle Hours has 215 folios (leaves) and is written in Gothic script. The text is written in a single column, and some pages end with catchwords. It was probably written by two different scribes, one who wrote the bulk of the text and another who adjusted the manuscript for Johannete Ravenelle. The book is decorated with 14 miniatures, as well as several larger and smaller initials, border decoration, drolleries and other decorative elements. The miniatures are placed at the beginning of certain important sections of text, the first eight of them at the beginning of the respective parts of the Hours of the Virgin. Each page with a miniature is also more richly decorated, with ivy-leaf borders where dragons nestle among the branches. Stylistically, the miniatures and the decoration as a whole is typical for Parisian books of hours from the late 14th century and early 15th century. The figures still display ideas of beauty typical for the 14th century such as wavy hair and round cheeks; and the folds of their dress are occasionally rendered in a conservative way for the time. The postures of the figures on the other hand place them within the 15th century. The choice of subject matter is also conventional for the time, with some motifs such as Christ Enthroned (fol. 83r) and the Last Judgment (fol. 121v) being slightly old-fashioned at the time. A few of the miniatures also contain details which set them apart from other miniatures made by other artists; e.g. the hems of the clothes of some figures are depicted with unusual, "funnel-like folds" and some miniatures, e.g. the Crucifixion (fol. 102v) are painted so that the top or bottom of the image is cut off by the frame.

The book is currently bound in a dark red leather binding, signed by the French bookbinder Lortic and probably made at the turn of the twentieth century. The front cover is decorated with gilded and blind tooled fleurs-de-lis, and the spine is labelled with gilt lettering.

== Works cited ==
- Andersson-Schmitt, Margarete; Hallber, Håkan; Hedlund, Monica (1992). Mittelalterliche Handschriften der Universitätsbibliothek Uppsala: Katalog über die C-Sammlung (in German). Vol. 5. Stockholm: Almqvist & Wiksell. ISBN 91-554-2904-1.
- Lindqvist Sandgren, Eva (2002). The Book of Hours of Johannete Ravenelle. Uppsala: Uppsala University. ISBN 91-554-5207-8.
