= Pala d'Oro =

High altar retable in the Basilica di San Marco, Venice

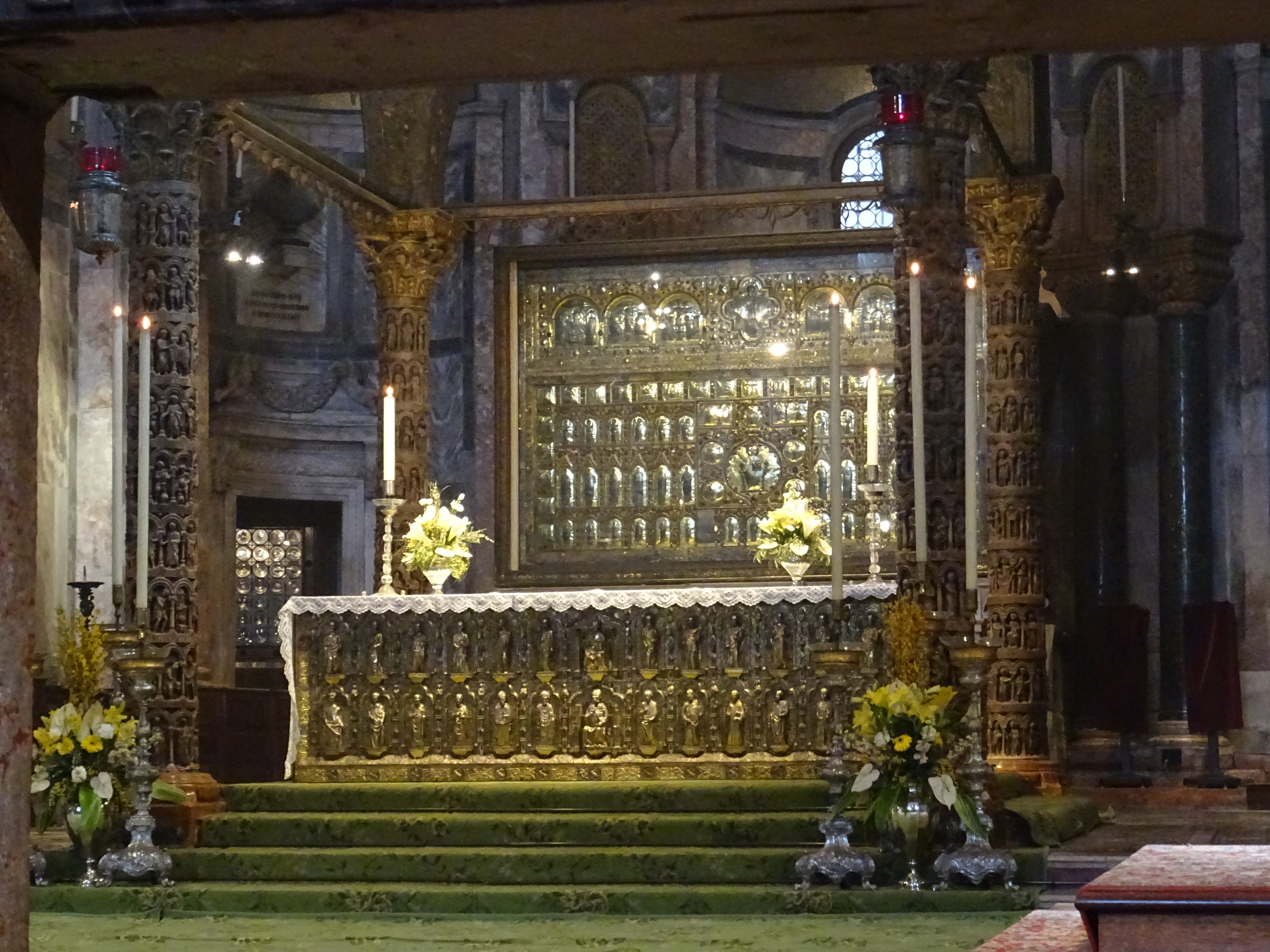
Pala d'Oro viewed in its altarpiece setting

Pala d'Oro (Italian: Golden Panel) is the high altar retable of the Basilica di San Marco in Venice (and in Italian may refer to other gold altar frontals elsewhere). It is universally recognized as one of the most refined and accomplished works of Byzantine enamel, with both front and rear sides decorated. It was created and expanded in several phases over many centuries. Most of the enamel panels were made in Constantinople or Italy in a Byzantine style, but some were probably looted in Constantinople during the Fourth Crusade in 1204 and brought from there to Venice.

== History ==
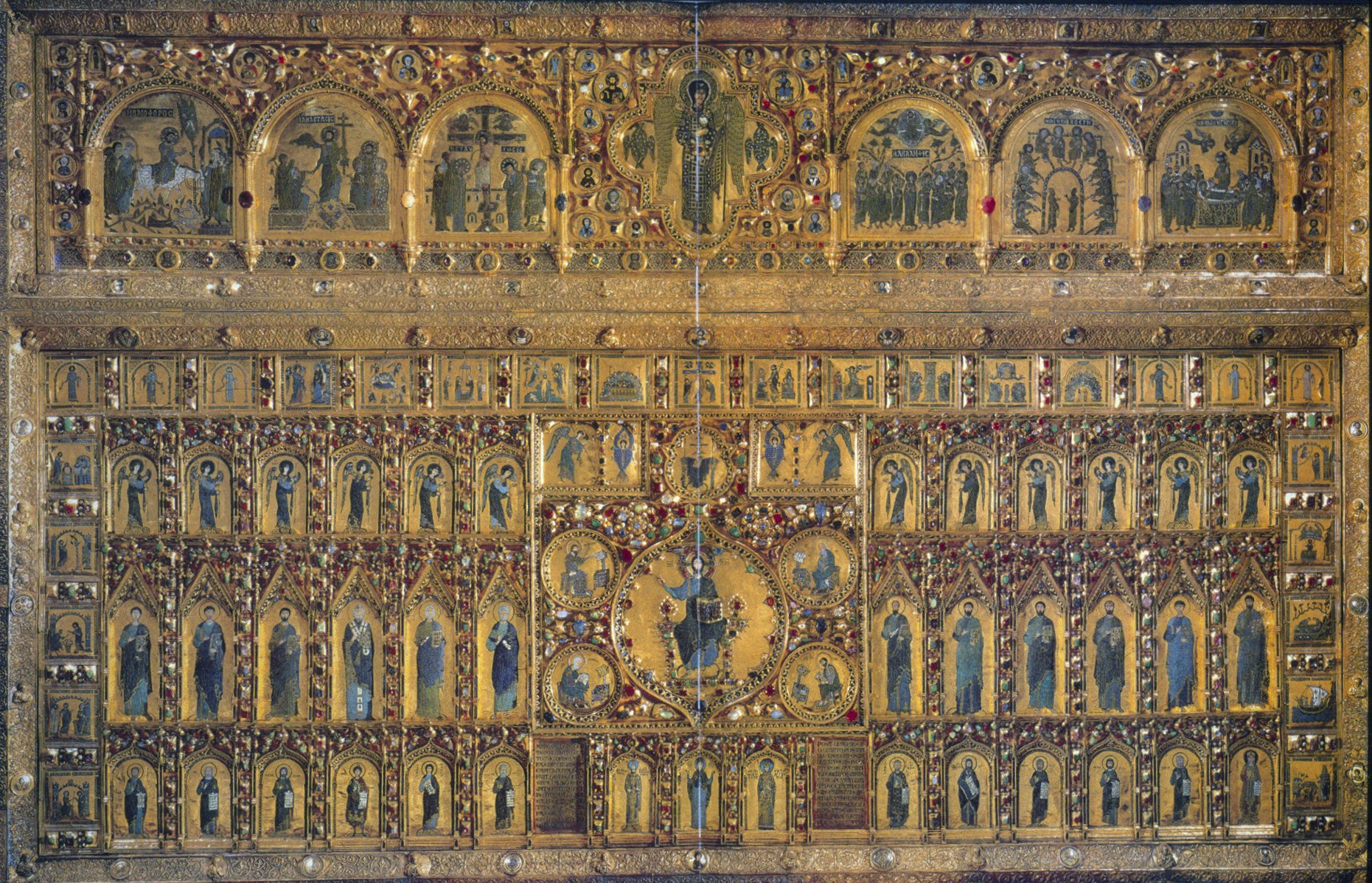
Pala d'Oro from a closer view

The Pala d'Oro was thought to be first commissioned in 976 by Doge Pietro Orseolo, where it was made up of precious stones and several enamels depicting various saints, and in 1105 it was expanded on by Doge Ordelafo Faliero. In 1342, the goldsmith Giovanni Paolo Bonesegna was commissioned to complete the altarpiece by Andrea Dandolo, who was the procurator at the time, and later became doge. Bonesegna added a Gothic-style frame to the piece, along with more precious stones. Dandolo also included an inscription describing what his own additions were, along with those of his predecessors.

Paolo Veneziano was commissioned to make wood panels to provide a cover (Pala Feriale) for when the altarpiece was not on display. Veneziano was commissioned between 1342-4 to make this cover, where it was dated 1345 and signed by him along with his sons, Luca and Giovanni. The cover is made from two pieces. The top plank features the Man of Sorrows in the center, who is surrounded by the Virgin and Sts. John, George, Mark, Peter, and Nicholas. The bottom plank shows narratives of Life, Martyrdom, Burial, and Translation of St Mark. The wooden panels were opened to the public during liturgies only. In the 15th century, Veneziano's "exterior" altarpiece was replaced by a wooden panel which remains today, though the Pala is now always open.

In 1995, Veneziano's wooden Pala Feriale cover underwent conservation treatment funded by the non-profit organization Save Venice Inc.

== Description ==
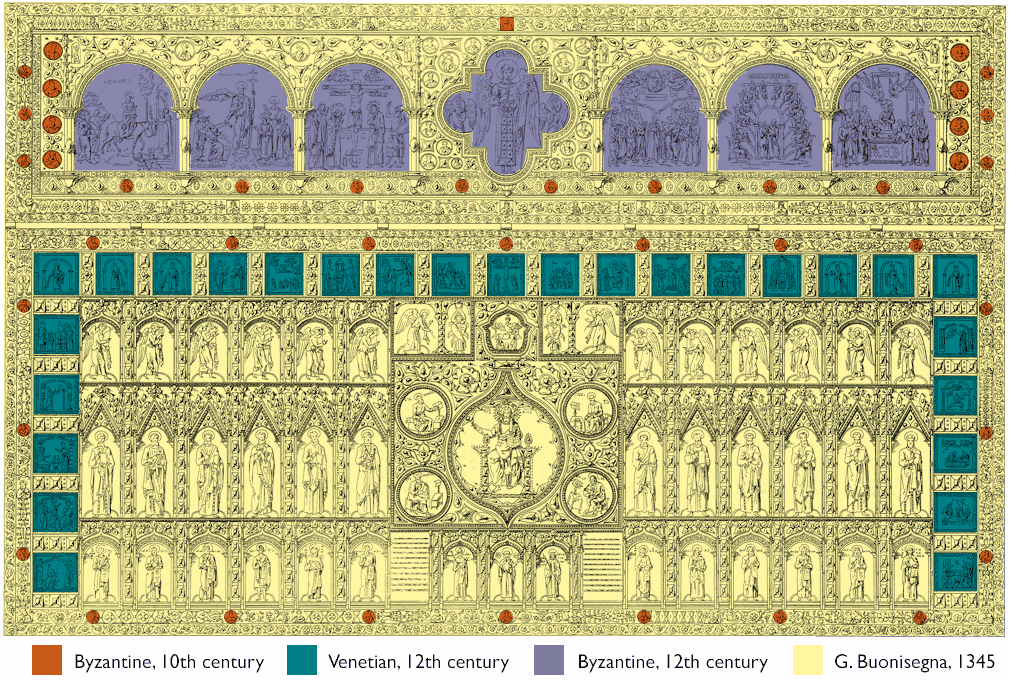
Development and elements of the Pala d'Oro

The altarpiece is 334 cm (10 ft 11½") wide by 212 cm (6ft 11½") tall. It is made of gold and silver, 187 enamel plaques, and 1,927 gems. These include 526 pearls, 330 garnets, 320 emeralds, 255 sapphires, 183 amethysts, 175 agates, 75 rubies, 34 topazes, 16 carnelians, and 13 jaspers.

=== Top Section ===
The altarpiece consists of two parts. The enamels in the top section of the Pala d'Oro contain the Archangel Michael at the center, with six images depicting the Life of Christ on either side of him, which were added in 1209. They show the Entry of Christ into Jerusalem, Descent into Limbo, Crucifixion, Ascension, Pentecost, and Death of the Virgin. It's generally thought that these were not originally part of the altarpiece, as their stylistic features place them into the 12th century, and they were probably looted during the Fourth Crusade.

=== Bottom Section ===
In the centre of the bottom section is Christ Pantocrator.

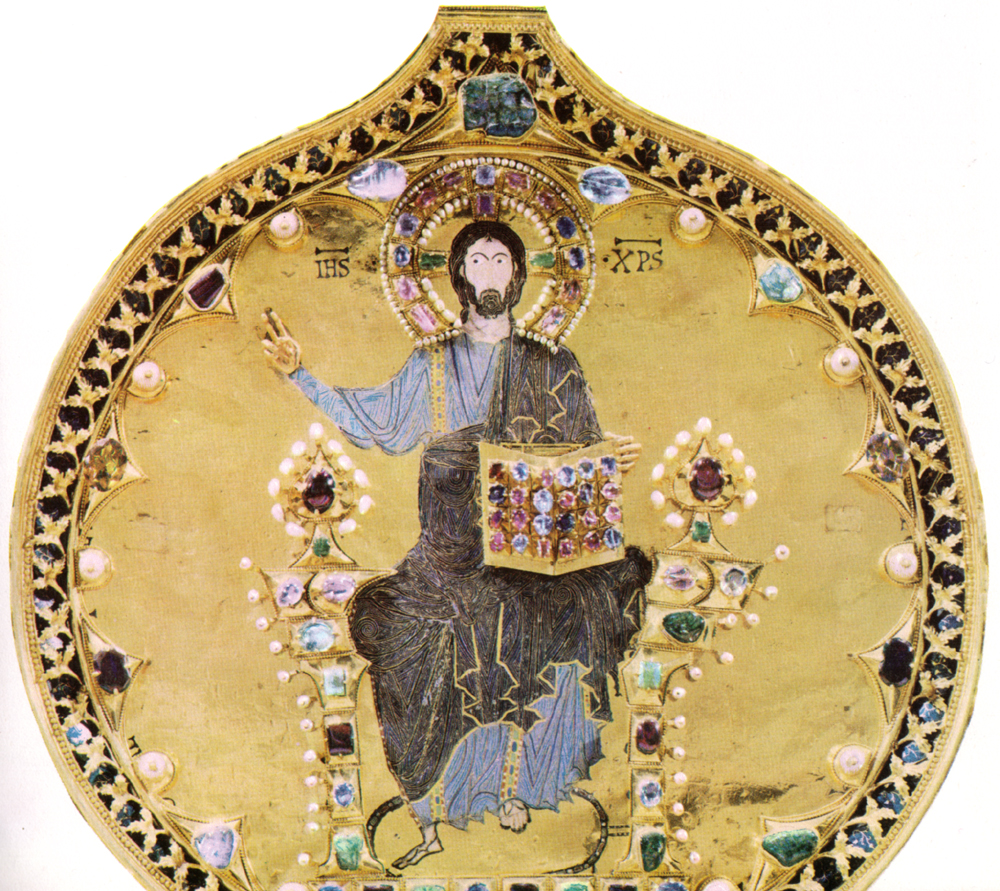
The central panel of Christ in Majesty

The four circular enamels around him are images of the Four Evangelists. To the right and left of Christ are the twelve apostles, six to each side. Above Christ is an empty throne, which represents the Last Judgement and the Second Coming of Christ, with angels and archangels on either side of it.

Underneath Christ is the Virgin Mary, flanked by the Byzantine Empress Irene and Doge Ordelafo Faliero. There is also a narrative border along the top and sides depicting the life, martyrdom, and translation of the relics of St. Mark. These were created in 1105 in Constantinople, and were commissioned by Doge Ordelaffo Falier. They used to be positioned along the base, but have since been moved to their current position.

=== Doge Falier and Empress Irene ===
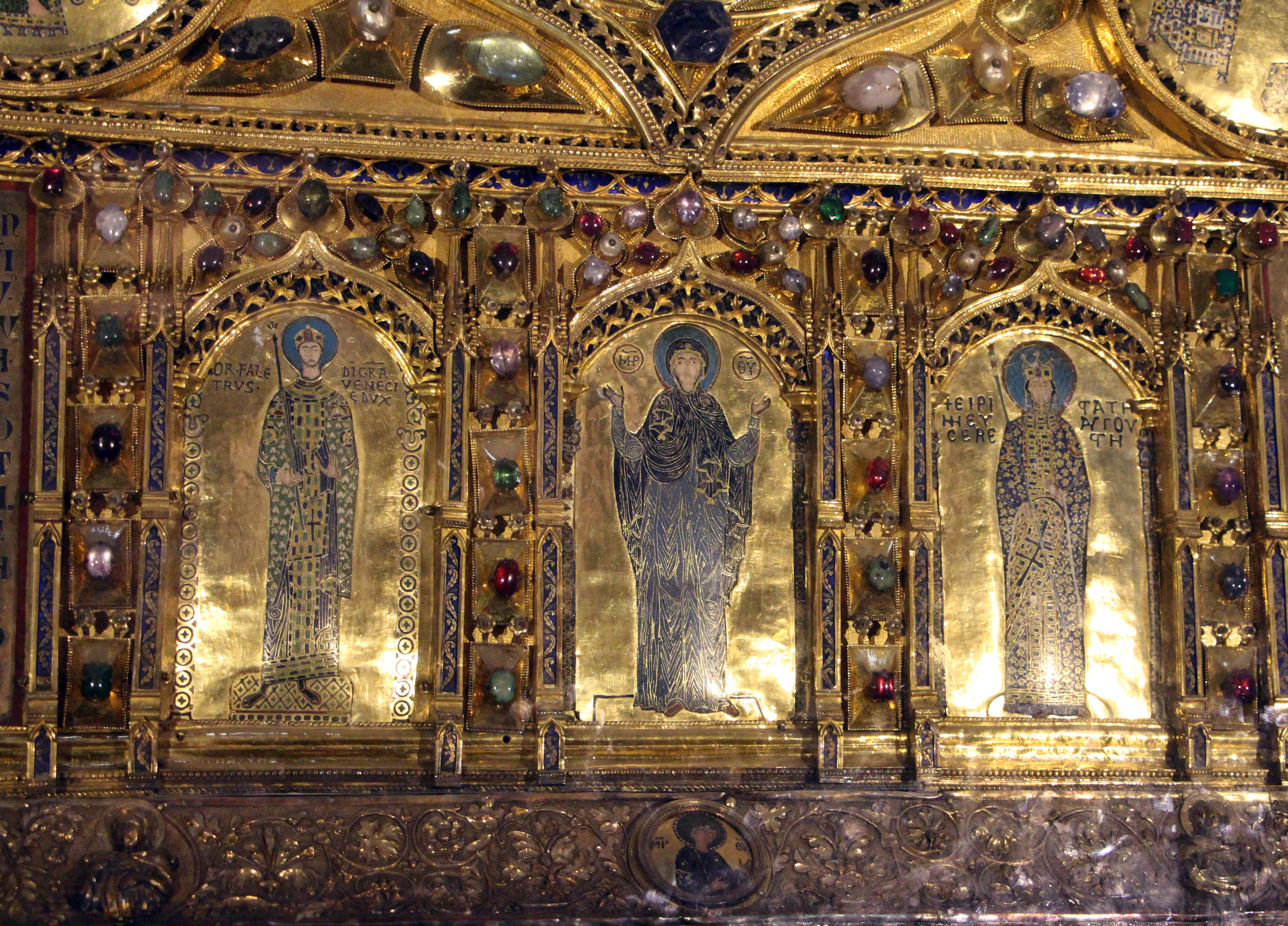
Doge Ordelaffo Falier, the Virgin, and Empress Irene

The two figures beside the Virgin are images of Doge Ordelaffo Falier and Byzantine Empress Irene. The depiction of Falier seems to be slightly off as his head is too small in proportion to his body. There is evidence that shows the original head was removed, and replaced with a new one. There are also scratches on the enamel from when the previous head was removed, and some type of wax or paste was used to fill in the gaps where the replacement piece didn't exactly fit.

While there have been theories that the previous head depicted an emperor, that explanation doesn't quite fit. Emperors are usually depicted with red footwear, but this figure wears black, with no sign of having been altered. Additionally, the enamel bears Falier's name, which would have required much effort to change and would have left evidence behind. The most likely explanation is that the original head was in fact Falier's head, but without a halo. Later, church officials — possibly even Falier himself — decided to replace it to include a halo. The scepter he holds restricted how much could be altered, which required the crafters to make the new image slightly smaller.
