= Oberrœdern =

- Commune
- Coat of arms
- Location of Oberrœdern
- Location within France Location within Grand Est
- Coordinates: 48°55′20″N 7°58′29″E
- Country: France
- Region: Grand Est
- Department: Bas-Rhin
- Arrondissement: Haguenau-Wissembourg
- Canton: Wissembourg

Government
  - Mayor (2020–2026): Claude Philipps
- Area^{1}: 5 km^{2} (1.9 sq mi)
- Highest elevation: 182 m (597 ft)
- Lowest elevation: 129 m (423 ft)
- Population (2023): 508
  - Density: 100/km^{2} (260/sq mi)
- Time zone: UTC+01:00 (CET)
  - Summer (DST): UTC+02:00 (CEST)
- INSEE/Postal code: 67349 /67250
- ^{1} French Land Register data, which excludes lakes, ponds, glaciers > 1 km^{2} (0.386 sq mi or 247 acres) and river estuaries.

Oberrœdern (French pronunciation: [ˈɔbeʁœdɛʁn]; German: Oberrödern) is a commune in the Bas-Rhin department in Grand Est in north-eastern France. It was part of the commune of Stundwiller between 1974 and 1989.

== See also ==
- Communes of the Bas-Rhin department
