= Master of the Washington Coronation =

Italian painter

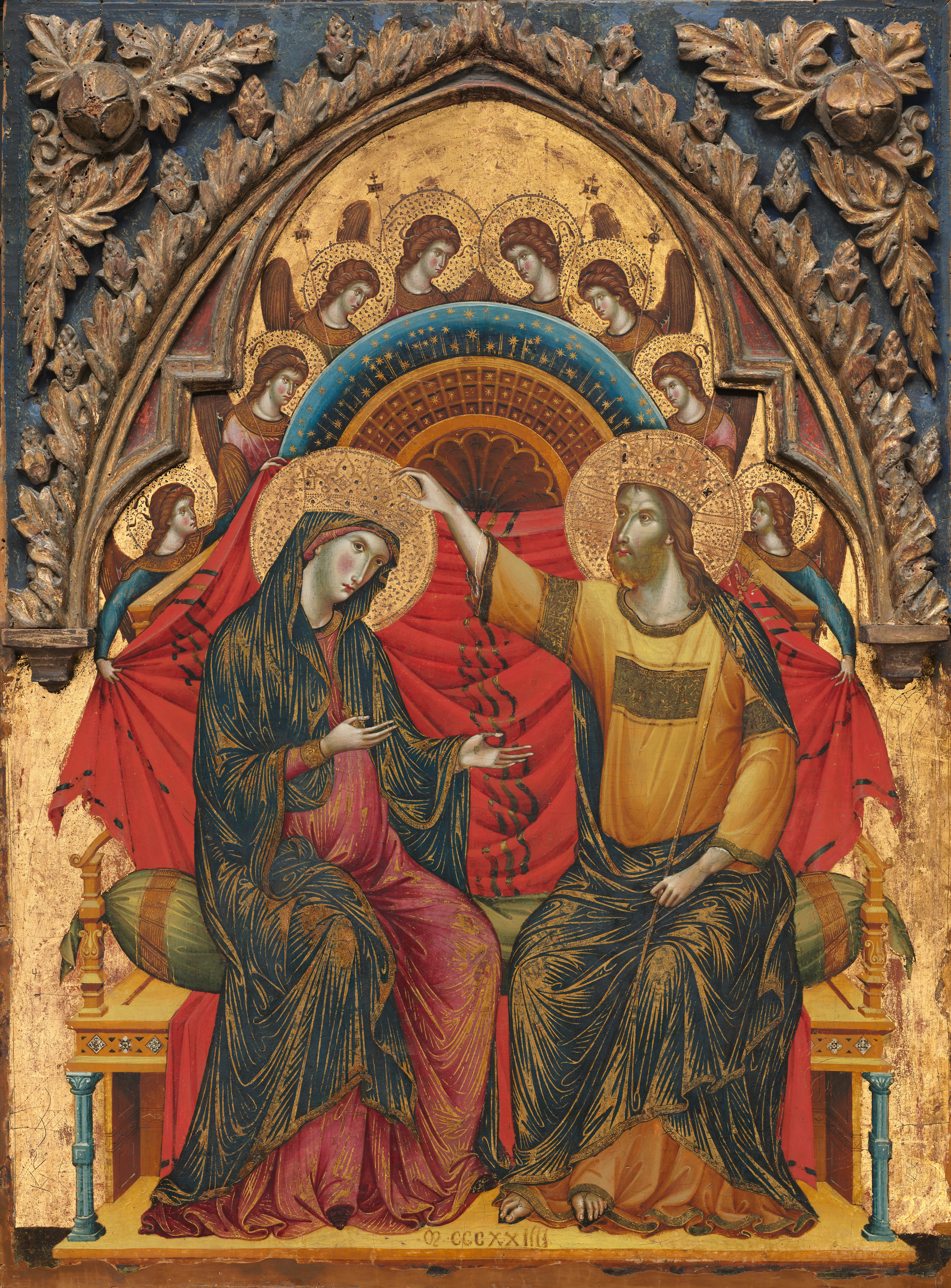
Coronation of the Virgin (c. 1333 - 1362). Tempera on panel, 99.1 x 77.5 cm. In the collection of the National Gallery of Art, Washington, D.C.

The Master of the Washington Coronation is a poorly known Italian painter who was active in Venice around 1324. His name is derived from a panel painting of the Coronation of the Virgin, dated to that year and held in the collections of the National Gallery of Art in Washington, D.C. This and an associated group of other works were previously accepted to be by Paolo Veneziano, however the Gallery does not officially list them as such anymore. Some authorities have distinguished the paintings from Paolo's output on stylistic grounds; one has even suggested that they may be by Marco di Martino da Venezia, Paolo's brother, who was active from 1335 to 1345 but from whom no documented work is known to have survived. The two brothers were recorded together in Treviso in 1335 by a local notary, and are known to have resided in the same Venetian parish ten years later. Other critics have posited a belief that the panels date to an earlier period, and are the work perhaps of Martino, father of the two men.
