= Retable =

Structure or element placed on or behind an altar or communion table

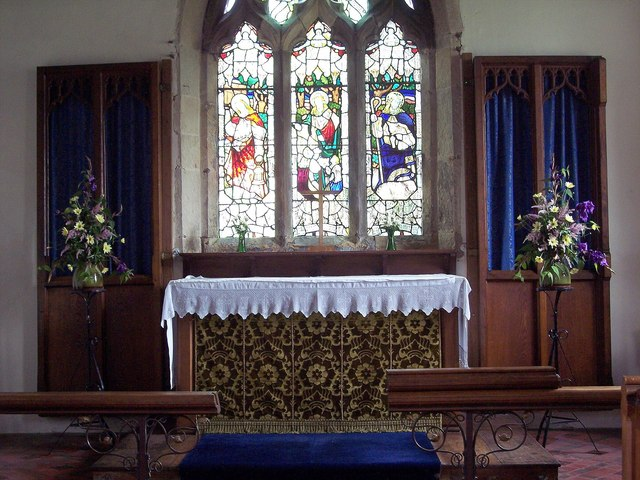
A simple shelf retable in Yorkshire

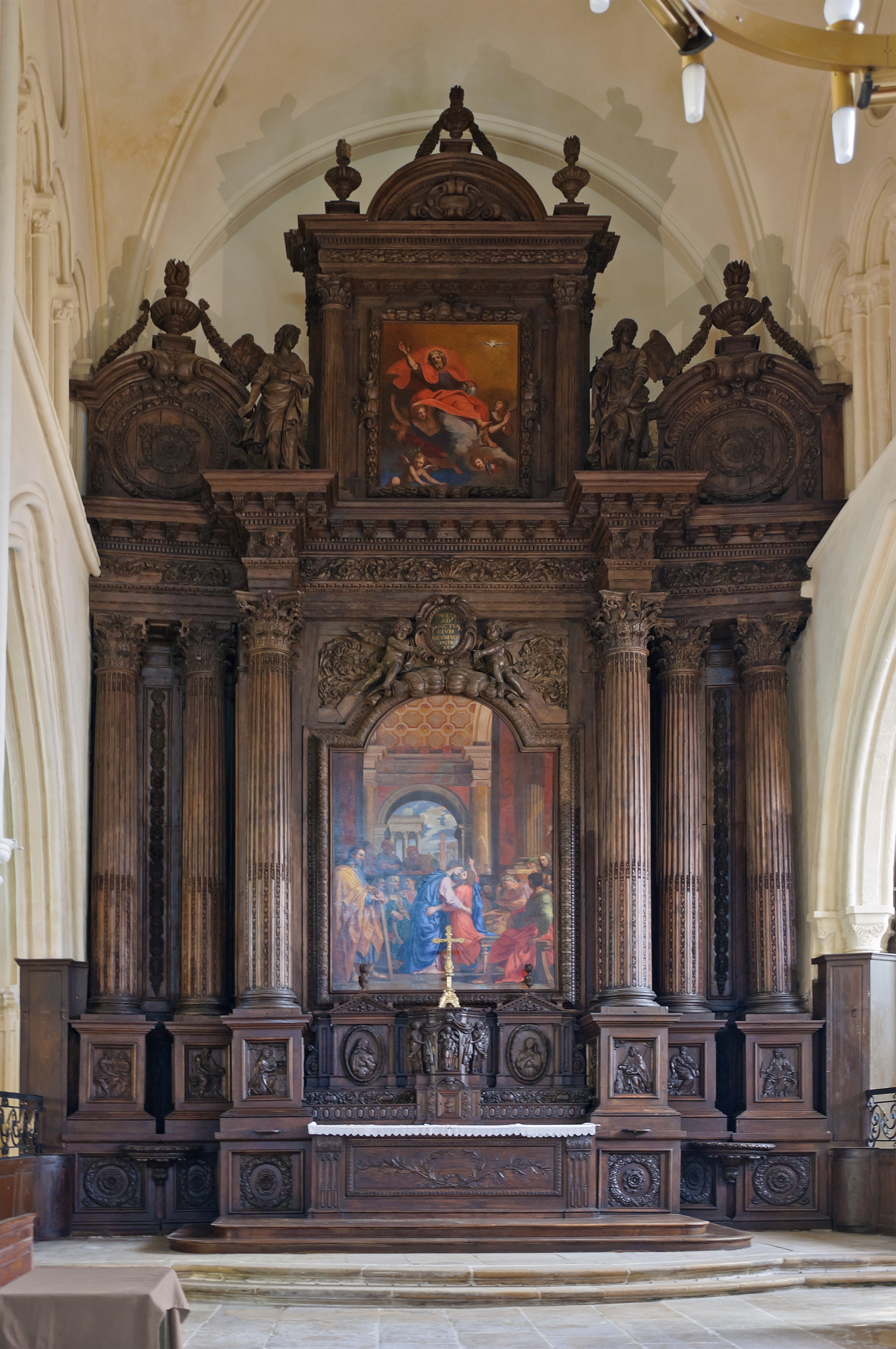
On one strict definition, this French 17th-century construction is a retable rather than a reredos, as it is all one construction.

A retable is a structure or element placed either on or immediately behind and above the altar or communion table of a church. At the minimum, it may be a simple shelf for candles behind an altar, but it can also be a large and elaborate structure. A retable which incorporates sculptures or paintings is often referred to as an altarpiece.

According to the Getty Art & Architecture Thesaurus Online, "A 'retable' is distinct from a 'reredos'; while the reredos typically rises from ground level behind the altar, the retable is smaller, standing either on the back of the altar itself or on a pedestal behind it. Many altars have both a reredos and a retable." This distinction is not always upheld in common use, and the terms are often confused or used as synonyms. In several foreign languages, such as French (also using 'retable'), the usage is different, usually equating the word with the English 'reredos' or 'altarpiece', and this often leads to confusion and incorrect usage in translated texts. The Medieval Latin retrotabulum (modernized retabulum) was applied to an architectural feature set up at the back of an altar, and generally taking the form of a screen framing a picture, carved or sculptured work in wood or stone, or mosaic, or of a movable feature such as the Pala d'Oro in St Mark's Basilica, Venice, of gold, jewels and enamels. The non-English word "retable" therefore often refers to what should in English be called a reredos. The situation is further complicated by the frequent modern addition of free-standing altars in front of the old integrated altar, to allow the celebrant to face the congregation, or be closer to it.

Dossal is another term that may overlap with both retable and reredos; today it usually means an altarpiece painting rising at the back of the altar to which it is attached, or a cloth usually hanging on the wall directly behind the altar.

The cognate Spanish term, retablo, refers also to a reredos or retrotabulum, although in the specific context of Mexican folk art, it may refer to any two-dimensional depiction (usually a framed painting) of a saint or other Christian religious figure, as contrasted with a bulto, a three-dimensional statue of same.

The retable may hold the altar cross, mostly in Protestant churches, as well as candles, flowers and other things.

== See also ==
- Reredos
- Retablo
