= Master of the Coronation of the Virgin (Paris) =

French painter of illuminated manuscripts

The Master of the Coronation of the Virgin is a conventional name given to a medieval illuminator and painter active in Paris c. 1400. He is named after his work in a manuscript of the Golden Legend, and was given his Notname by Millard Meiss. He is also notable as the painter for a copy of Giovanni Boccaccio's De mulieribus claris.
