= Stundwiller =

- Commune
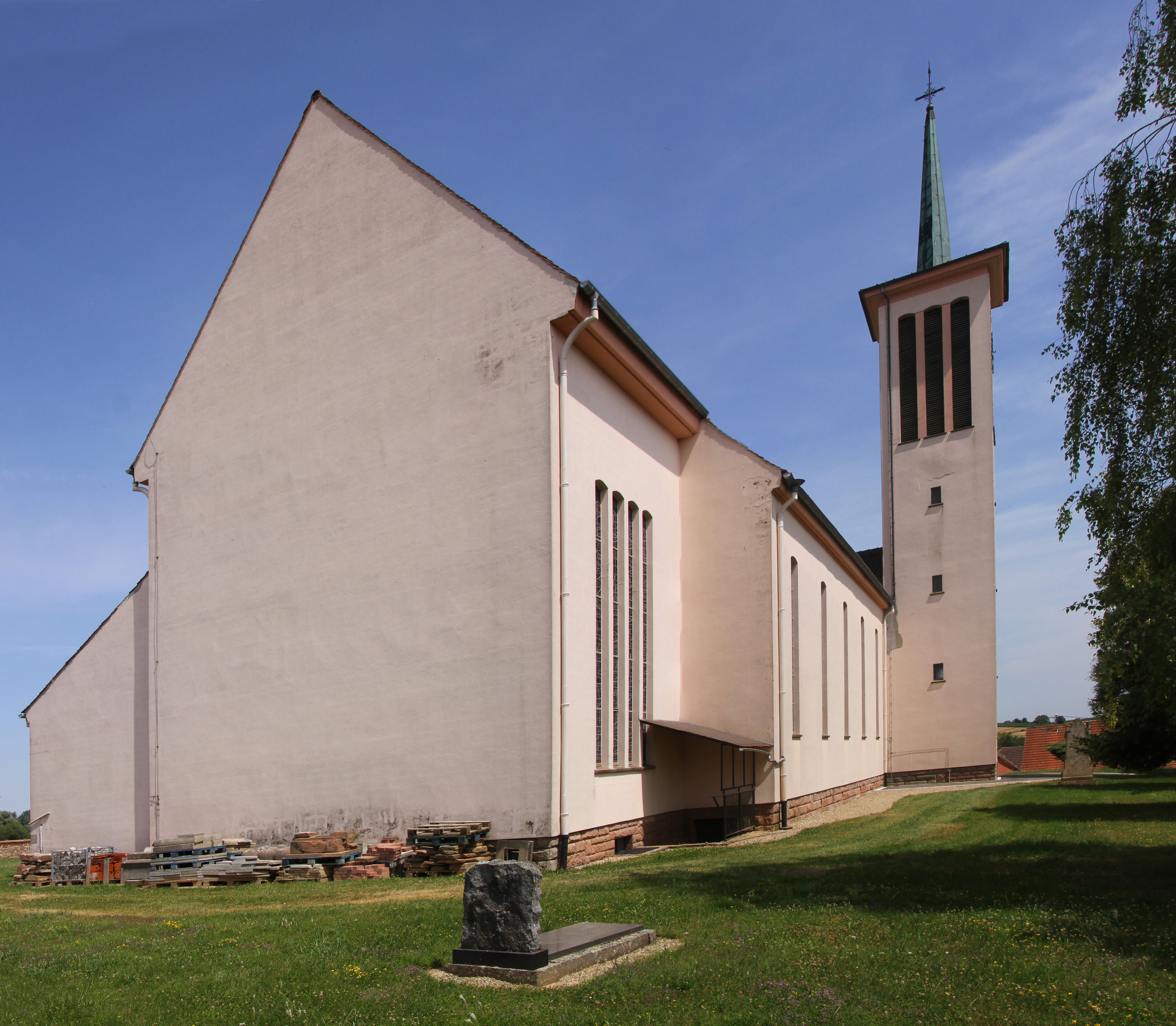
- The church in Stundwiller

- Coat of arms
- Location of Stundwiller
- Location within France Location within Grand Est
- Coordinates: 48°55′35″N 7°59′28″E
- Country: France
- Region: Grand Est
- Department: Bas-Rhin
- Arrondissement: Haguenau-Wissembourg
- Canton: Wissembourg

Government
  - Mayor (2020–2026): Alain Wurster
- Area^{1}: 3.32 km^{2} (1.28 sq mi)
- Highest elevation: 179 m (587 ft)
- Lowest elevation: 128 m (420 ft)
- Population (2023): 523
  - Density: 158/km^{2} (408/sq mi)
- Time zone: UTC+01:00 (CET)
  - Summer (DST): UTC+02:00 (CEST)
- INSEE/Postal code: 67484 /67250
- ^{1} French Land Register data, which excludes lakes, ponds, glaciers > 1 km^{2} (0.386 sq mi or 247 acres) and river estuaries.

Stundwiller (German: Stundweiler) is a commune in the Bas-Rhin department in Grand Est in north-eastern France. It is 15 km west of the French border with Germany.

== See also ==
- Communes of the Bas-Rhin department
