= Jean Boileau =

Jean Boileau may refer to:

- Jean Boileau (fl. 1272–1291), a minister-general of the Trinitarian Order,
- Jean Boileau (1924–2005), a Canadian radio broadcaster noted for his longtime association with radio station CHRC in Quebec City,
- Jean Boileau (b. 1959), a Canadian actor and screenwriter,
- Jean Boileau, founder of the Gatineau Hot Air Balloon Festival.
