= School of Paris (Middle Ages) =

Period of manuscript illumination

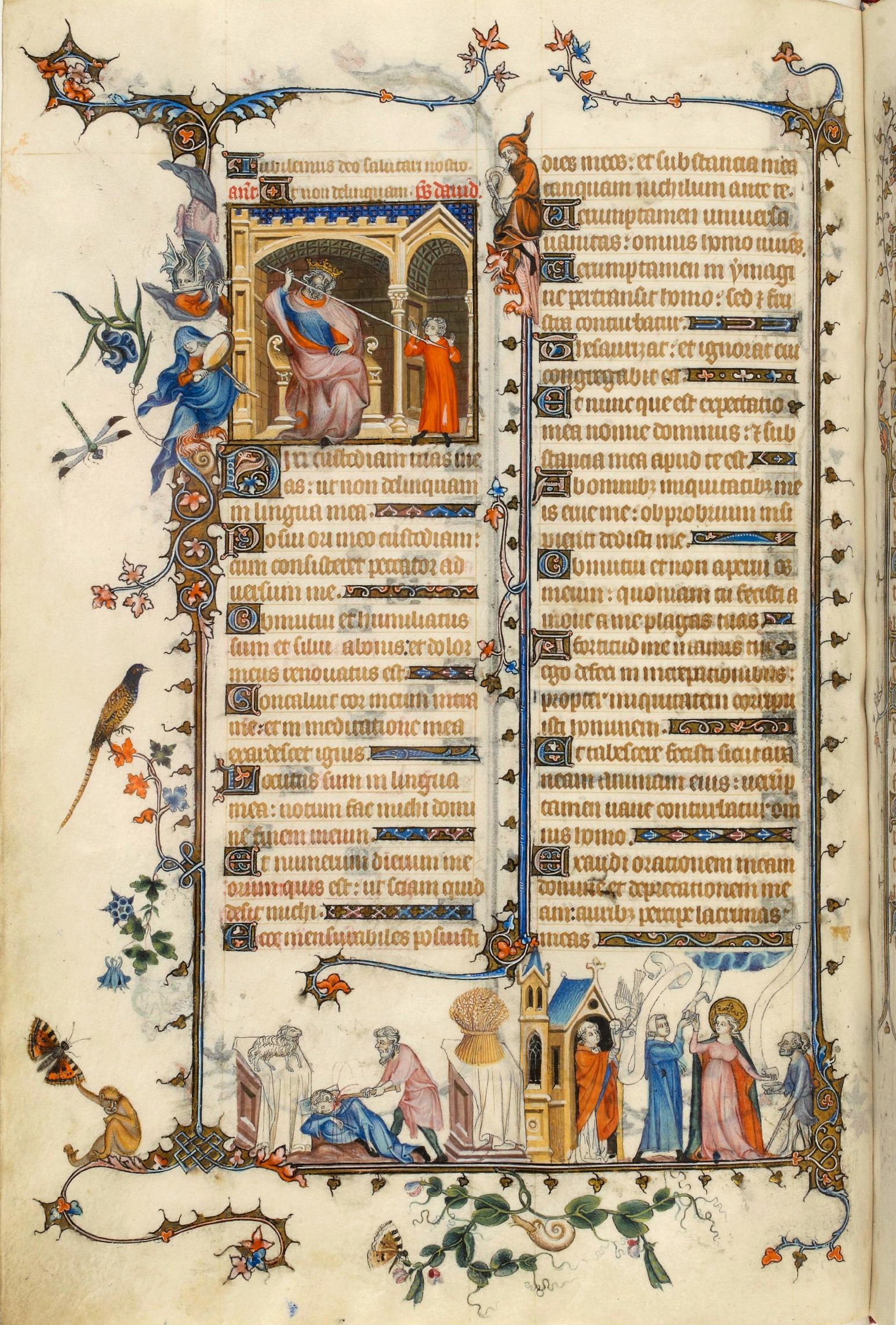
Page from the Belleville Breviary by Jean Pucelle, 1320s.

School of Paris refers to the many manuscript illuminators, whose identities are mostly unknown, who made Paris an internationally important centre of illumination throughout the Romanesque and Gothic periods of the Middle Ages, and for some time into the Renaissance. Among the most famous of these artists were Master Honoré, Jean Pucelle and Jean Fouquet.

The Limbourg brothers, originally from the Netherlands, also spent time in Paris, as well as Burgundy and Bourges, but their style is not typical of the School of Paris of the day.

Many of the painters in Parisian workshops were women. Gradually, especially from 1440 onwards, Parisian illuminators lost international customers, such as the English elites, to their Flemish competitors, based in particular in Bruges and Ghent. Around the same time Tours became for a time the most important French centre.

== See also ==
- Master of Robert Gaguin
- Ravenelle Hours
- Book of Hours
