= Master of Robert Gaguin =

French painter

The Master of Robert Gaguin was an anonymous painter, active in Paris around 1485–1500. He was so named by Nicole Reynaud after a manuscript of Robert Gaguin's translation of Julius Caesar's De Bello Gallico, offered by the translator to Charles VIII, king of France. He belongs to a circle of French artists, whose art follows the style of the Master François.

== Style ==
His style is very close to the work of the Master of Jacques of Besançon, with whom he collaborated and could have been the disciple. His art is more modern than his master, though. His manner is close to the style of Jean Colombe and the illuminators of Rouen. He decorated several printed copies for Antoine Vérard and he also probably designed about thirty woodcuts used by this Parisian publisher.

== Works attributed to the Master ==
=== Manuscripts ===
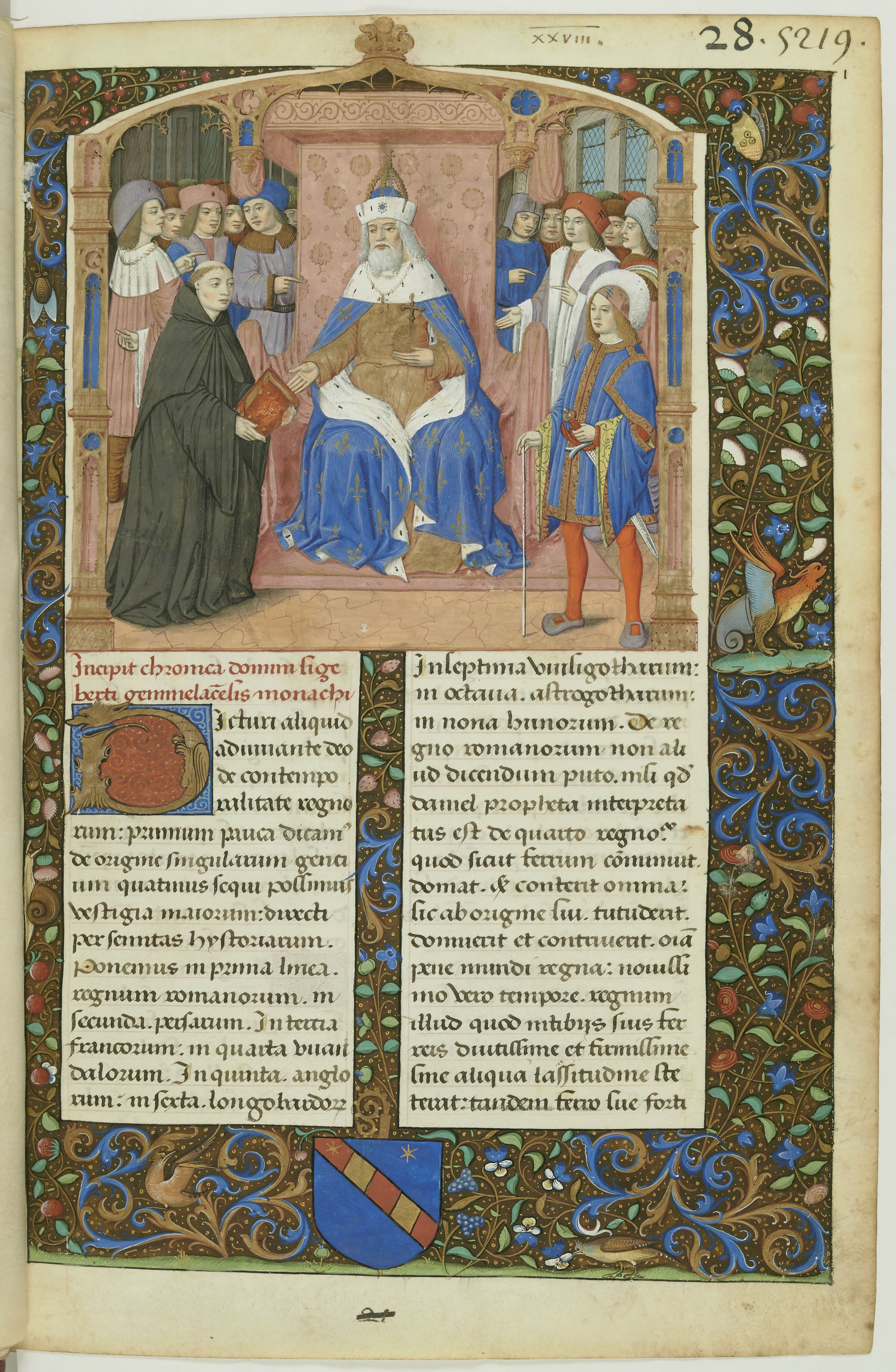
Frontispiece of the Chronique universelle of Sigebert of Gembloux.

- Julius Caesar, [Commentarii De Bello Gallico, fr.:] Commentaire de la Guerre des Gaules (trad. Robert Gaguin and offered by him to Charles VIII; private collection)
- Sigebert of Gembloux, Chronique universelle, (frontispiece miniature, around 1493-1495; Paris, Bibliothèque nationale de France: Lat.4994)
- Virgil, Opera (Municipal Library of Dijon : Ms.493; digital copy)
- Book of Hours, use of Rouen (2nd half of the 15th century; Municipal Library of Versailles: M 139; digital copy)
- Henry de Ferrers, Livre du roy Modus (1491-1498, Bibliothèque de Genève: Fr.168)
- Book of Hours, use of Paris (2 miniatures, f.19 and 141v; Vatican Library: Vat.Lat.9212)

=== Illuminated printed copies ===
- Grandes Chroniques de France, for Antoine Vérard, 1493 (Paris, BnF: Vélins 730)
- L'Ordinaire des chrétiens, for Antoine Vérard, 1494 (copy prepared for Charles of Angoulême; Paris, BnF: Vélins 357; digital copy)
- Lancelot du Lac, for Antoine Vérard, 1494 (copy prepared for Charles of Angoulême; Paris, BnF: Vélins 617 entirely, Vélin 618-619 with the Master of Philippe of Gueldre)
- Raoul Lefèvre, Recueil des histoires troiennes, Antoine Vérard, [around 1494] (Chantilly, Musée Condé: MC 1080)
- Jean V de Bueil, Le Jouvencel, Antoine Vérard, 1493/94 (priv. coll., sold via Sotheby's auctions)

=== Woodcut designs ===
- Valerius Maximus, [Facta et dicta memorabilia, fr.:] Valère le Grand (tr. and comm. Simon de Hesdin and Nicolas de Gonesse), Paris: [Gillet Couteau(?)] for Antoine Vérard, [between October 1499 and June 1503]
- Terentius Afer (Publius), [Comœdiae, fr.:] Térence en français, Paris: [Gillet Couteau(?)] for Antoine Vérard, [between October 1499 and 30 May 1503] (only full-page woodcuts)
- Jean Gobin, Les Loups ravissants, Paris: for Antoine Vérard, [around 1505]
- Bartholomaeus Anglicus, [De Proprietatibus rerum, fr.:] Le Livre des propriétés des choses (tr. Jean Corbechon, ed. Pierre Farget), Paris: [Gillet Couteau(?)] for Antoine Vérard, [non long after the end of October, 1499]

== Sources ==
- Avril, François; Reynaud, Nicole (1993). BNF/Flammarion (ed.). Les manuscrits à peintures en France, 1440-1520. Flammarion. pp. 262–263. ISBN 978-2-08-012176-9.
- Delaunay, Isabelle (2000). Échanges artistiques entre livres d'heures manuscrits et imprimés produits à Paris: 1480- 1500 (PhD thesis) (in French). Paris: Université Paris 4.
- Bonicoli, Louis-Gabriel (2015). La production du libraire-éditeur parisien Antoine Vérard (1485-1512): nature, fonctions et circulation des images dans les premiers livres imprimés illustrés (Doctoral thesis) (in French). Université Paris Ouest. (this dissertation is available at the BnF; see also the defense report)
