= Bibliothèque de Genève =

Library in Geneva, Switzerland

Coordinates: 46.20063°N 6.14460°E

Library of Geneva
- Bibliothèque de Genève
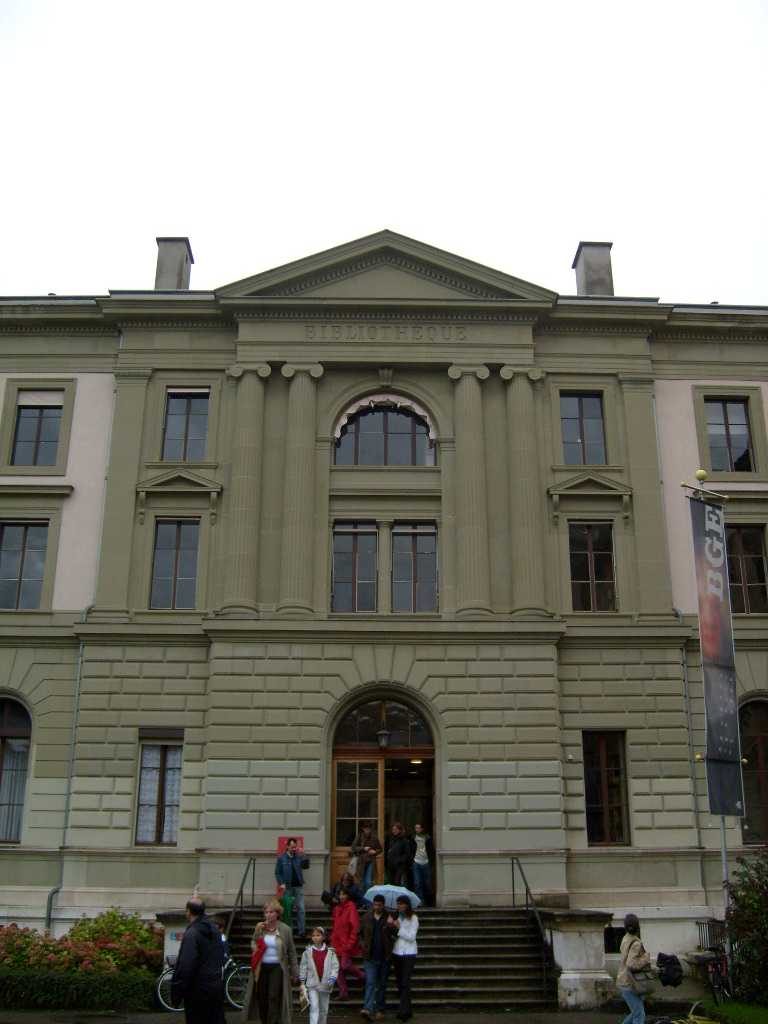
- The main library's entrance in Parc des Bastions
- Location: Geneva, Switzerland
- Established: 1559; 467 years ago

Collection
- Size: 7 million items+ including 2.15M volumes (modern and early printed works); 31,662 periodicals 280 medieval manuscripts 1,500 papyri 45,000 cartographic items 4.4M iconographic items 124,000 posters 66,000 music scores
- Legal deposit: Yes, provided in law by: Loi instituant le dépôt légal, 1967 (Canton Geneva)

Access and use
- Access requirements: Open to anyone with a need to use the collections and services

Other information
- Budget: CHF 17.5 million
- Director: Frédéric Sardet
- Website: bge-geneve.ch

Swiss Cultural Property of National Significance
- Official name: Bibliothèque de Genève
- Reference no.: 08925

The Bibliothèque de Genève (French: [biblijɔtɛk də ʒənɛv]; BGE) is the principal library of the City and Canton of Geneva, Switzerland. Founded in 1559, it is among the oldest libraries in the world to operate a legal deposit system, serving as the legal deposit library for the Canton of Geneva.

The library occupies several buildings across the city, including its main site in Parc des Bastions, the Musée Voltaire, La Musicale, and the Centre for Iconography. It also manages the library in Villa La Grange.

It focuses on the humanities and the social sciences with special emphasis on the Reformation, the Enlightenment and Genevensia (i.e. anything published in Geneva or whose author or subject is connected to Geneva).

== History ==
Geneva established a system of legal deposit as early as 1539, making it one of the oldest such in the world. At that time, publications produced in Geneva were deposited with the Chambre des comptes. John Calvin created the library twenty years later to serve the Académie in what is now Collège Calvin. The earliest mention of the library goes back to 1562.

In 1720, the Genevan theologian Ami Lullin acquired the Petau collection of illuminated manuscripts and left it to the library in 1756.

In 1872, the library moved to its current building in Parc des Bastions alongside Uni Bastions.

The Institut et Musée Voltaire was founded in 1954, Geneva's music library, now called La Musicale, in 1962, and the Centre d'iconographie in 1993.

In 1999, the library was added to the Swiss Inventory of Cultural Property of National and Regional Significance. In 2011, its Jean-Jacques Rousseau collections were included, jointly with those of the Bibliothèque publique et universitaire de Neuchâtel, in the Unesco Memory of the World Register.

== The main site (Bastions) ==
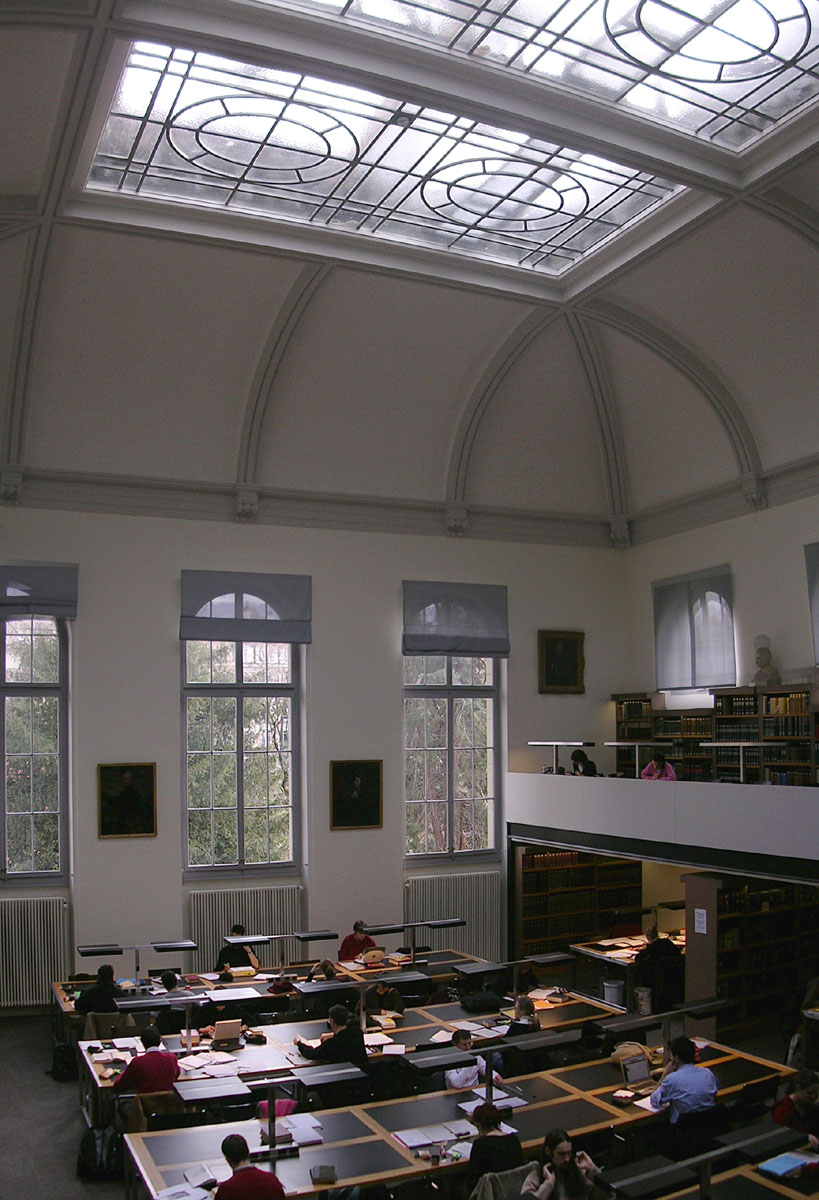
The main reading room

=== Books ===
In 2014, there were more than two million print volumes in the library's collections. Since the 20th century, the library has focused on the humanities and social sciences. Many of its incunable and other early modern books are available on e-rara.ch.

=== Manuscripts ===
As well as 1,500 papyri and 380 medieval manuscripts, the Bibliothèque de Genève holds the papers of such Geneva personalities as John Calvin, Jean-Jacques Rousseau, Horace-Bénédict de Saussure, Édouard Naville, Emile Jaques-Dalcroze and Nicolas Bouvier. Some of these manuscripts are available on e-codices.ch.

See also

- Charles Bally
- Isaak Benrubi
- Commentary on the Apocalypse
- Jean Courtecuisse
- De divina proportione
- Anna Eynard-Lullin
- Henri Fehr
- Jeanne de Jussie
- Georges-Louis Le Sage
- List of New Testament minuscules (1–1000)
- Livre de chasse
- Ella Maillart
- Minuscule 75
- Minuscule 323
- Marguerite Sechehaye
- Master of Robert Gaguin
- Afrikan Spir
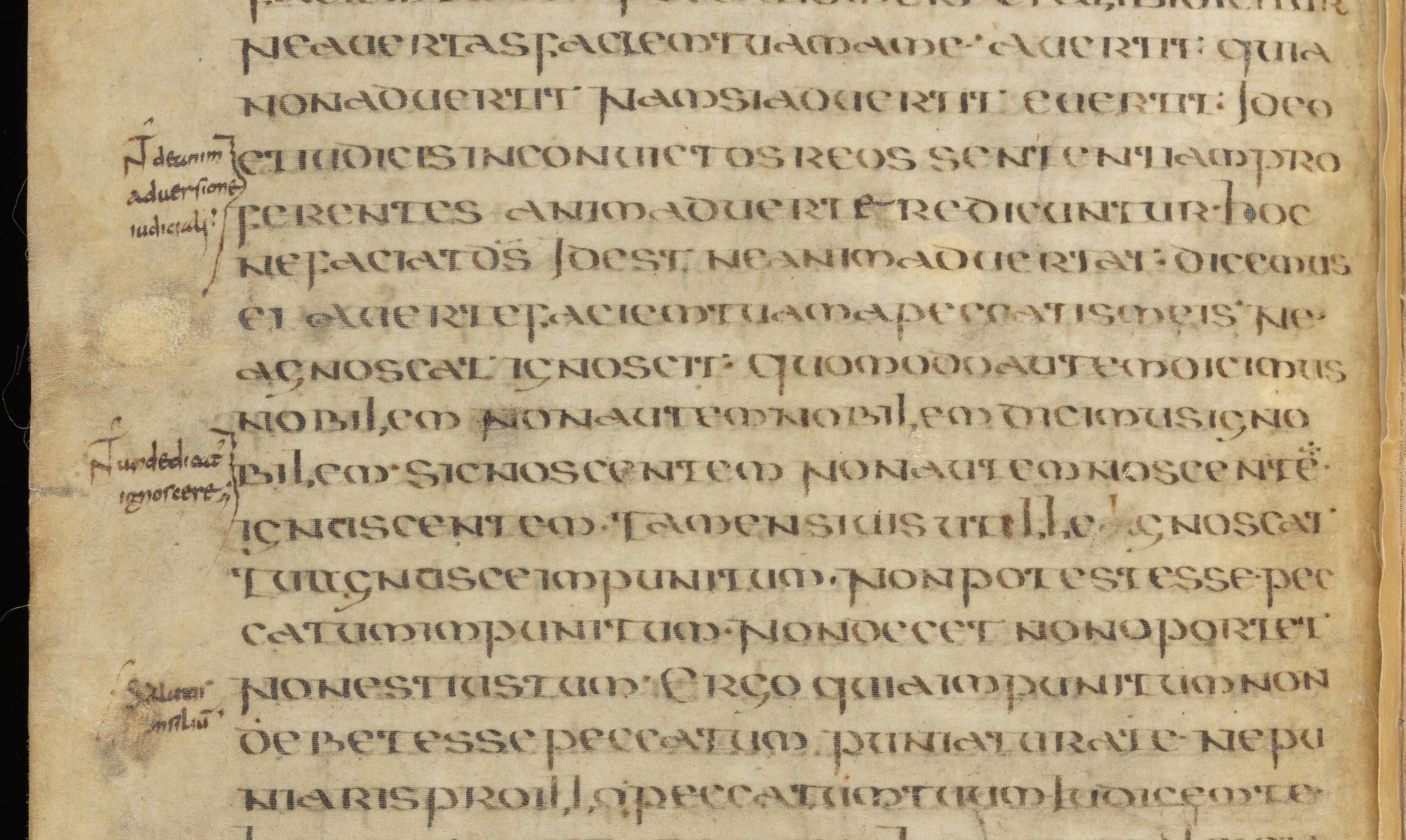
Annotation by Florus of Lyon on St Augustine (BGE, Ms. lat. 16, f.16v)

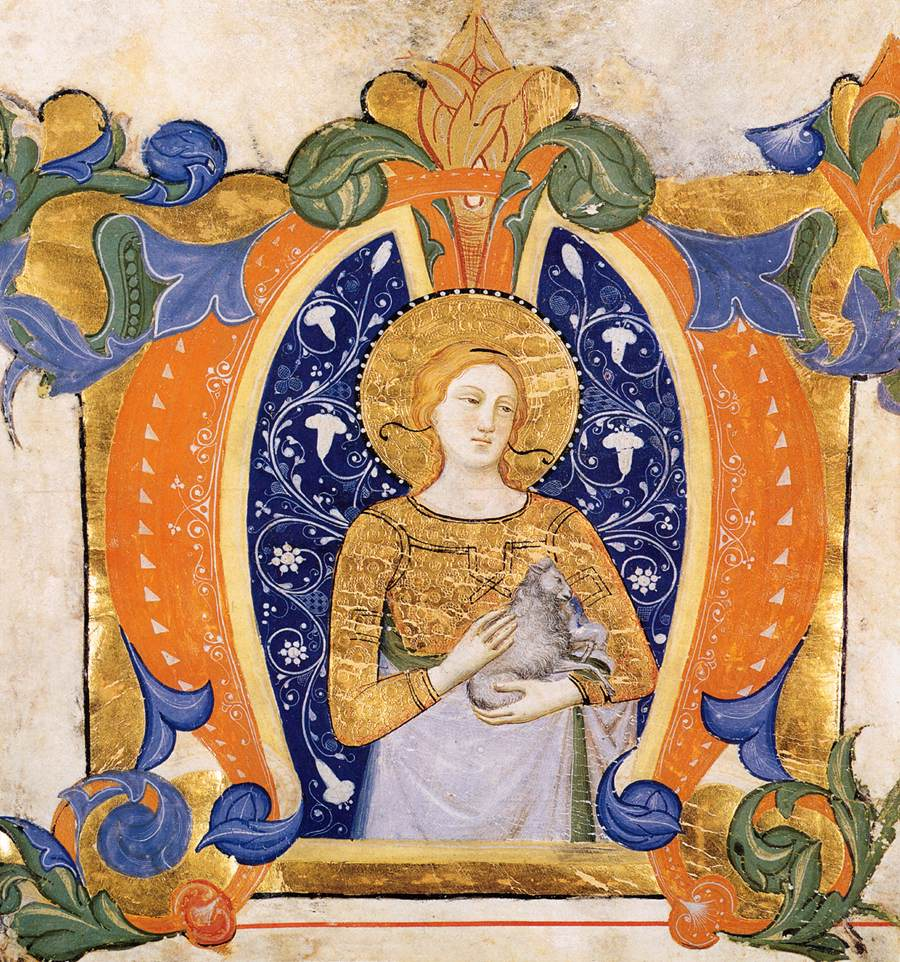
Silvestro dei Gherarducci, St Agnes in an initial M, f.32 of the Gradual from Santa Maria degli Angeli

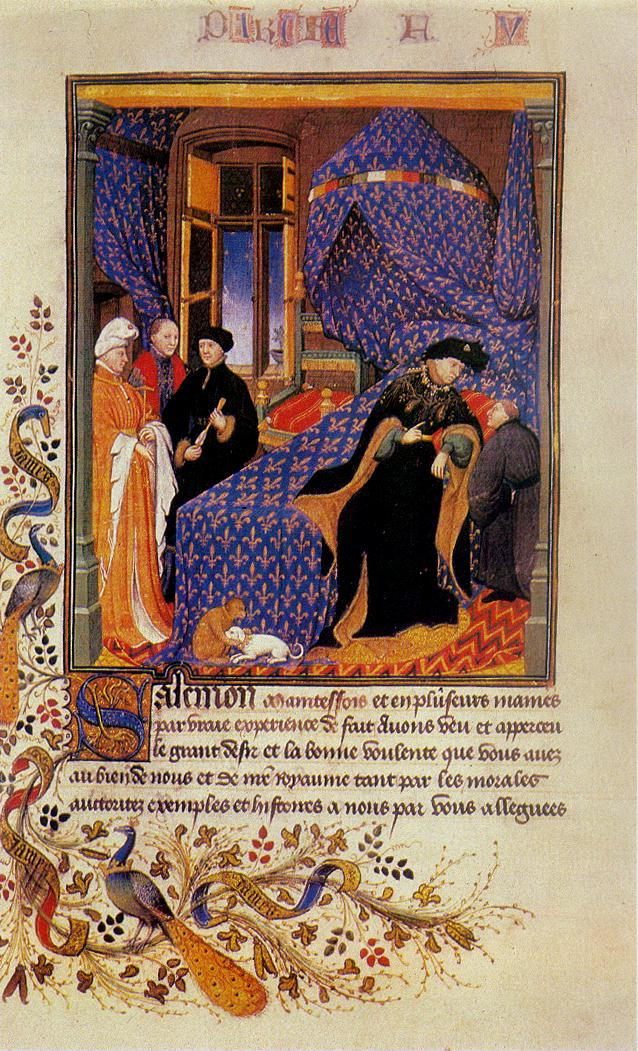
Pierre le Fruitier, called Salmon, Traictés de Pierre Salemon a Charles VI roy de France [Dialogues, second version] (BGE, Ms. fr. 165, f.4r)

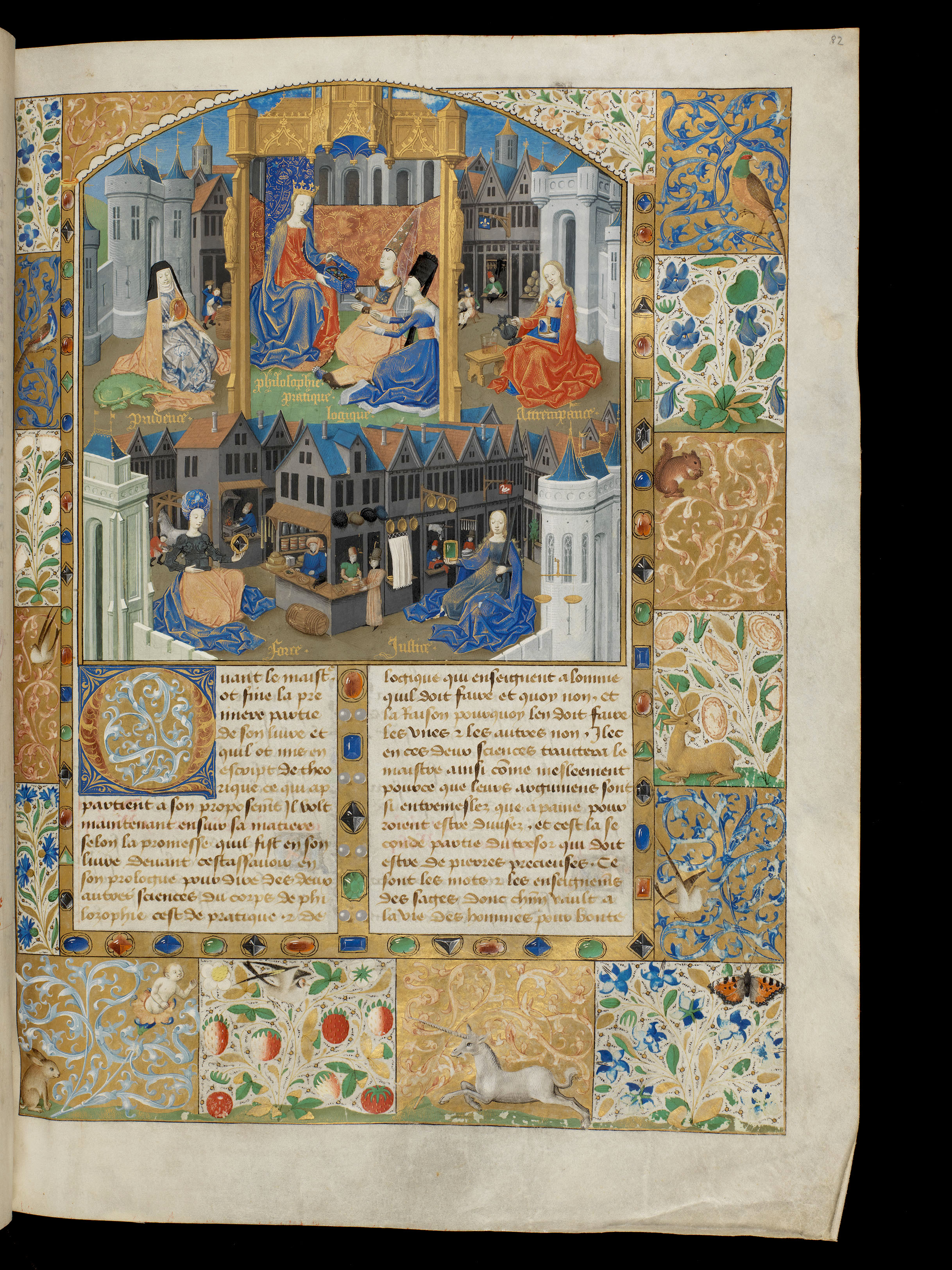
Brunetto Latini's Tesoro, illuminated by the Master of the Rouen Échevinage (BGE, Ms. fr. 160, f.82r)

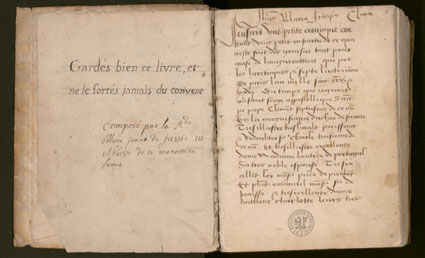
Jeanne de Jussie's manuscript of The Short Chronicle (BGE, Ms. Suppl. 1453)

=== Maps ===
The map collection was begun in 1893, when the Genevan cartographer Charles Perron, who drew most of the maps for Élisée Reclus's Nouvelle Géographie universelle, gave approximately 7,000 items to the library. It now has about 45,000 maps, dating from the 16th to the mid-20th century.

Maps of the city and canton of Geneva are kept at the Centre d'iconographie. The evolution of Geneva over the centuries can be seen on the GE200.ch website using some of these maps.

=== Posters ===
The library began collecting posters in 1851 and now has about 130,000. The collection documents life in Geneva, focusing on advertising, culture, social life, tourism and politics, including the struggles of the 1930s and protests from the 1960s and 1970s.

== Musée Voltaire ==
The Musée Voltaire, previously known as the Institut et Musée Voltaire, is both a museum and a library devoted to Voltaire and the 18th century. It is located on Geneva's right bank, in the Délices area. The museum has works by Jean Huber, Jean-Antoine Houdon, Hans Erni and others. The library has a significant number of manuscripts and 22,000 volumes, to be read in the reading room (not for loan).

== La Musicale ==
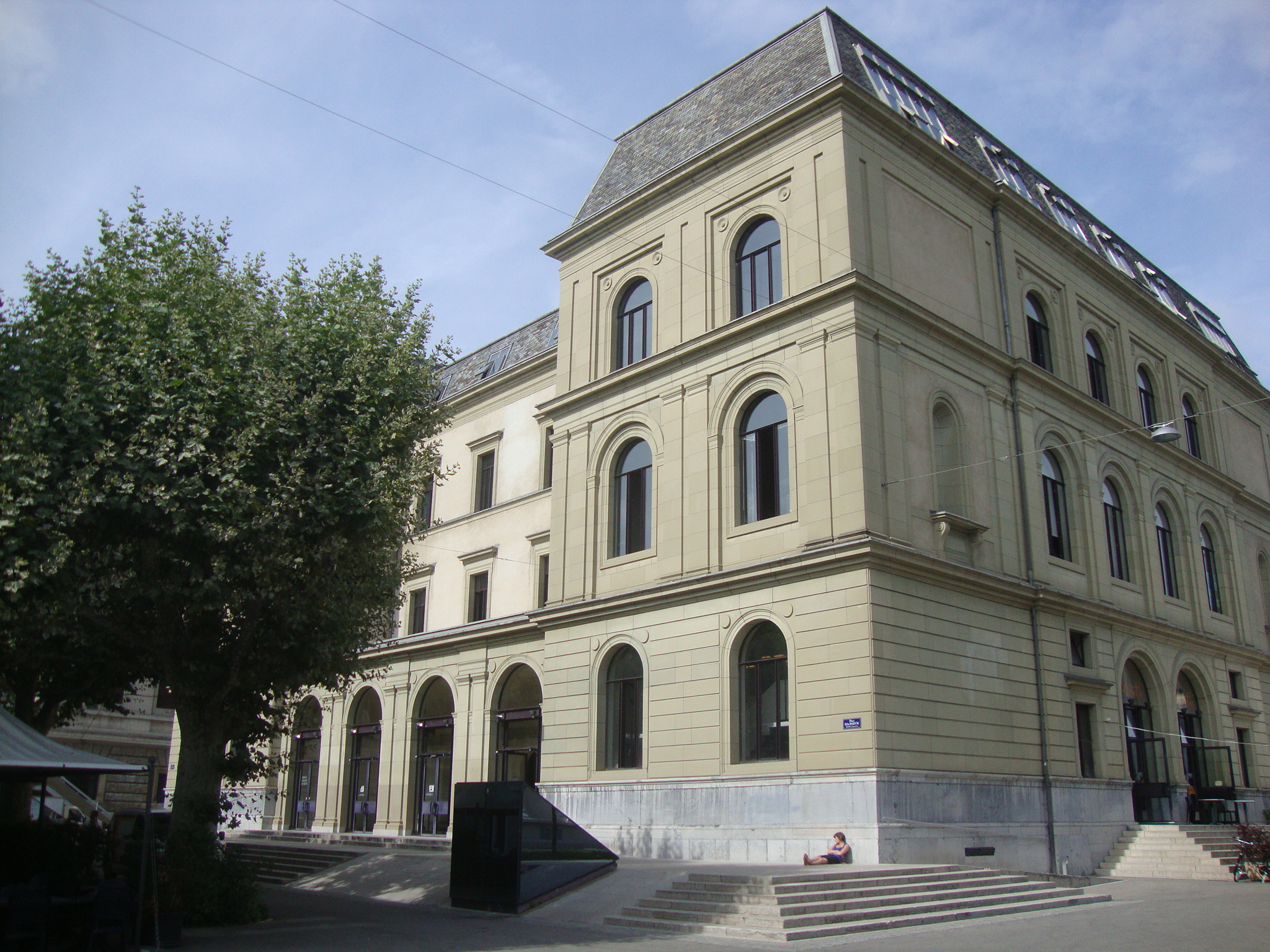
La Musicale

La Musicale, previously known as the Bibliothèque musicale de la ville de Genève, is Geneva's specialist music library, open to all. It is located near the Conservatoire, the Victoria Hall and the Grand Théâtre, on the first floor of the Maison des arts du Grütli. It has about 50,000 music scores (classical, jazz, rock, world music...), as well as relevant books and journals, and posters and concert programmes going back to the 19th century.

== Centre d'iconographie ==
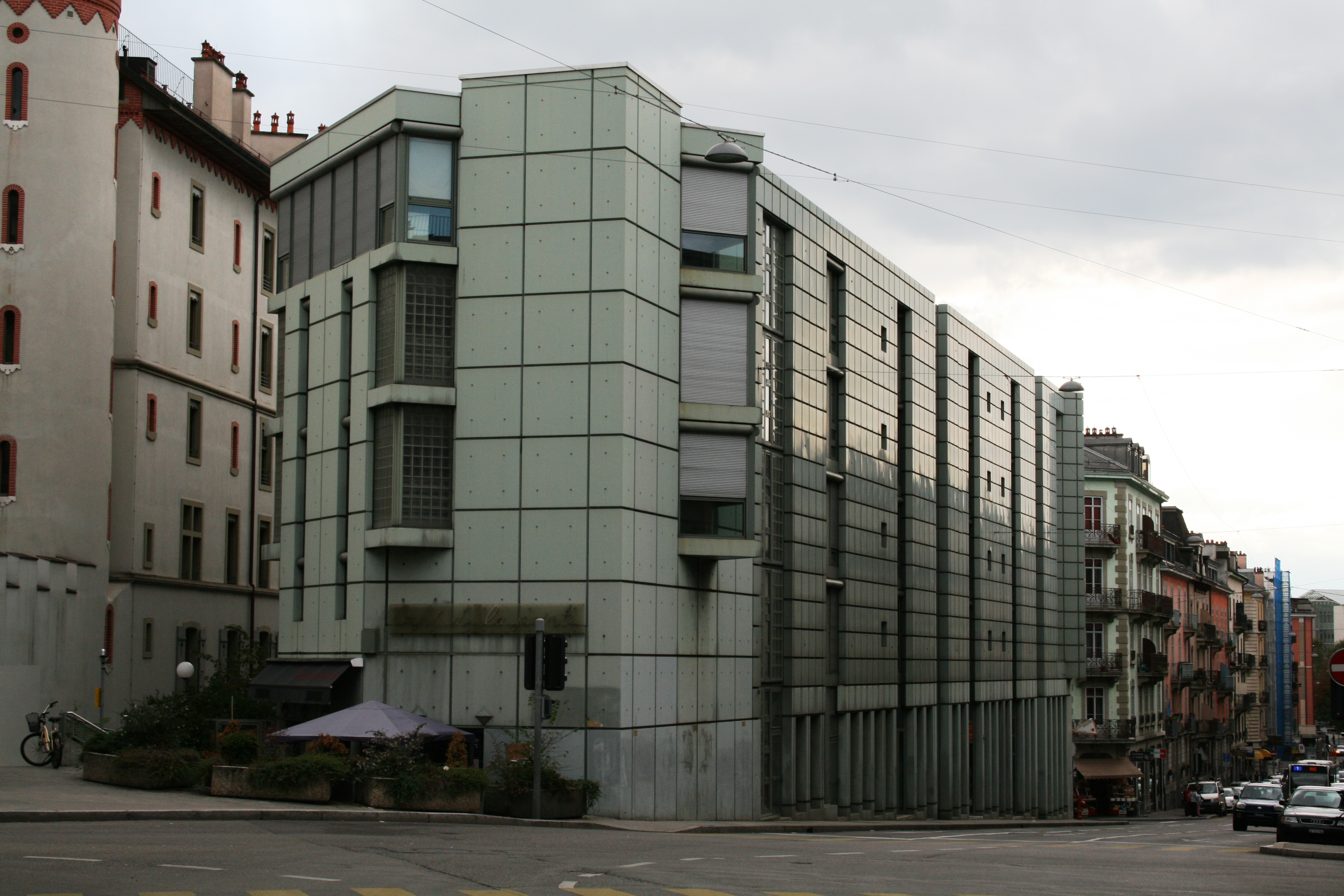
Centre d'iconographie

The Centre d'iconographie, previously known as the Centre d'iconographie de la ville de Genève or CIG, is an archive of about 4 million images, primarily of the city and canton of Geneva and the surrounding area, though not exclusively. It includes, for example, photos by the Genevan photographer Frédéric Boissonnas of the Balkans, Greece and North Africa. It is located near the Boulevard du Pont-d'Arve. Its collections are included in the Swiss Inventory of Cultural Property of National and Regional Significance.

== Bibliothèque La Grange ==
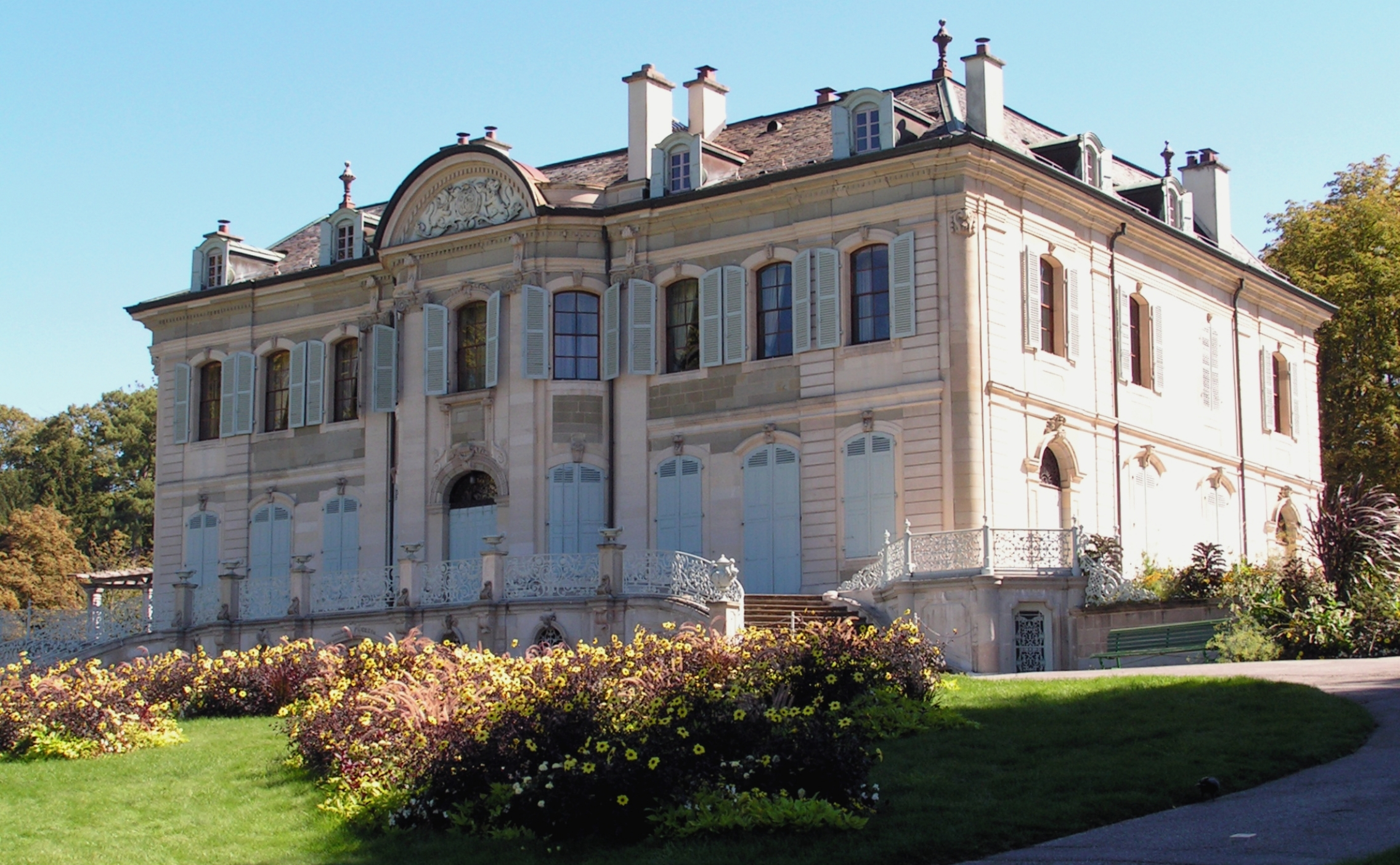
Villa La Grange

The private library of Guillaume Favre (1770-1851) contains about 5,600 works, in over 12,000 volumes, on history, literature and ancient languages, still in their original setting in Parc La Grange. They may be consulted in the main Bastions site of the Bibliothèque de Genève. Tours of the library are held each year in May.

== See also ==
- David le Boiteux
- Charles-Moïse Briquet
