= E-rara.ch =

Swiss digital library for antique works

e-rara.ch
- Location: Switzerland
- Type: Digital library
- Established: 2010

Collection
- Items collected: Antique Swiss prints, initially mainly of the 16th century
- Size: c. 850 works initially (March 2010)

Access and use
- Access requirements: Free online access

Other information
- Website: http://www.e-rara.ch

e-rara.ch is a Swiss digital library dedicated to providing free online access to rare antique Swiss books and prints. It opened to the public in March 2010, and aims to make more than 10,000 works available by the end of 2011.

== Project ==
The e-rara.ch project is part of the e-lib.ch initiative of the Swiss universities. It is hosted by the ETH Zurich's library and also includes works held by the university libraries of Basel and Bern, the Bibliothèque de Genève and the Zentralbibliothek Zürich.

The library's principal aim is to make the Swiss cultural heritage more widely available and to assist researchers, who would otherwise have to consult the rare works in situ.

== Collection ==
The library's initial focus is on prints of the 16th century. That century is considered the golden age of Swiss book printing on account of the many notable bibles, ceremonial prints, research treatises and writings related to the Reformation printed in Switzerland at that time, including works by Vesalius, Paracelsus, Zwingli and Calvin. Exceptional works from that era include the first full Latin translation of the Qur'an (1543). Works from other eras, notably incunables (pre-1501 prints) and 17th century prints, are scheduled to be digitized and added to the library at a later time.

The scanned works are made available in 300 dpi resolution as downloadable PDF files or as individual images through a web browser gallery.
