= Isaak Benrubi =

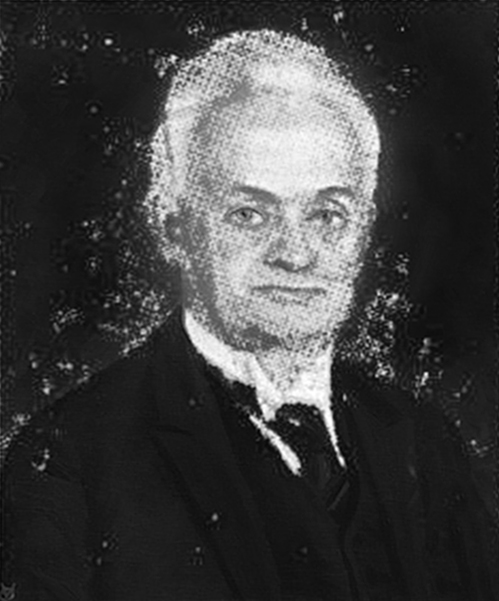
Isaak Benrubi

Isaak Benrubi (24 May 1876 in Thessaloniki – October 19 1943 in Geneva) was a philosopher from the Ottoman city of Thessaloniki, he opposed the conventional character of the act of knowing in "subject" and "object" to the reality that is interested in both subject and object: "I can't exist without the universe, neither can the universe exist without me". He decided to attend the CIC's meeting in Geneva only after learning that both Albert Einstein and Henri Bergson would also be attending.

== Biography ==
Benrubi was born in Thessaloniki, Ottoman Empire, in 1876. He came from an old family of rabbis, from the same Jewish community of Portuguese provenance, to which Spinoza belonged to in Amsterdam. He presented his thesis in German, under the direction of the great philosopher Eucken, on the "Moral ideal of J.J. Rousseau" (1904). According to Benrubi, Rousseau is the source of all German philosophy- from Kant to Nietzsche - and the spiritual father of the great poets Goethe, Schiller, and Holderlin. He studied philosophy and was educated in Jena, Berlin, and Paris (1898–1914). In 1904, he participated in the 2nd Congress of Philosophy in Geneva, where he stayed, teaching the history of European philosophy until his death. Between 1927 and 1933 he was appointed by the Prussian Government to teach French philosophy at Bonn, a job that he considered as a cultural mission for fostering the intellectual ties between France and Germany.

In his work Benrubi tries to go beyond the agnosticism and timidity of modern philosophical reflection, to re-establish the bridge between the Self and the things, to abolish the dualism of speculative and practical thinking. The author attempts to exhibit the universe as a whole: terrestrial unity, solidarity of the living, the existence of a human race, united in its diversity, arriving in conclusion at a moral: Natural obligation of cosmic and human solidarity. In a second work, Benrubi studied at depth the great movements of moral philosophy in a manuscript of more than 600 pages, that is archived at the Bibliothèque de Genève, in which the essential ideas of the sceptics, relativists and utilitarians are analyzed in detail and compared - from the Greek Sophists to Max Stirner and Herbert Spencer, passing through Montaigne, Blaise Pascal, La Rochefoucauld, and Helvétius, among others (J. H. Zeilberger).

== Works ==
- J. J. Rousseaus ethisches Ideal, 1904
- Rudolf Euckens kampf um einen neuen idealismus, 1911
- Contemporary thought of France, 1926
- Philosophische Strömungen der Gegenwart in Frankreich, 1928
- Les sources et les courants de la philosophie contemporaine en France, 1933
- Souvenirs sur Henri Bergson, Delachaux & Niestlé, Neuchâtel, 1942
- Connaissance et morale, 1947
