= Jeanne Hachette =

French military heroine

Coordinates: 49°25′48″N 2°4′56″E

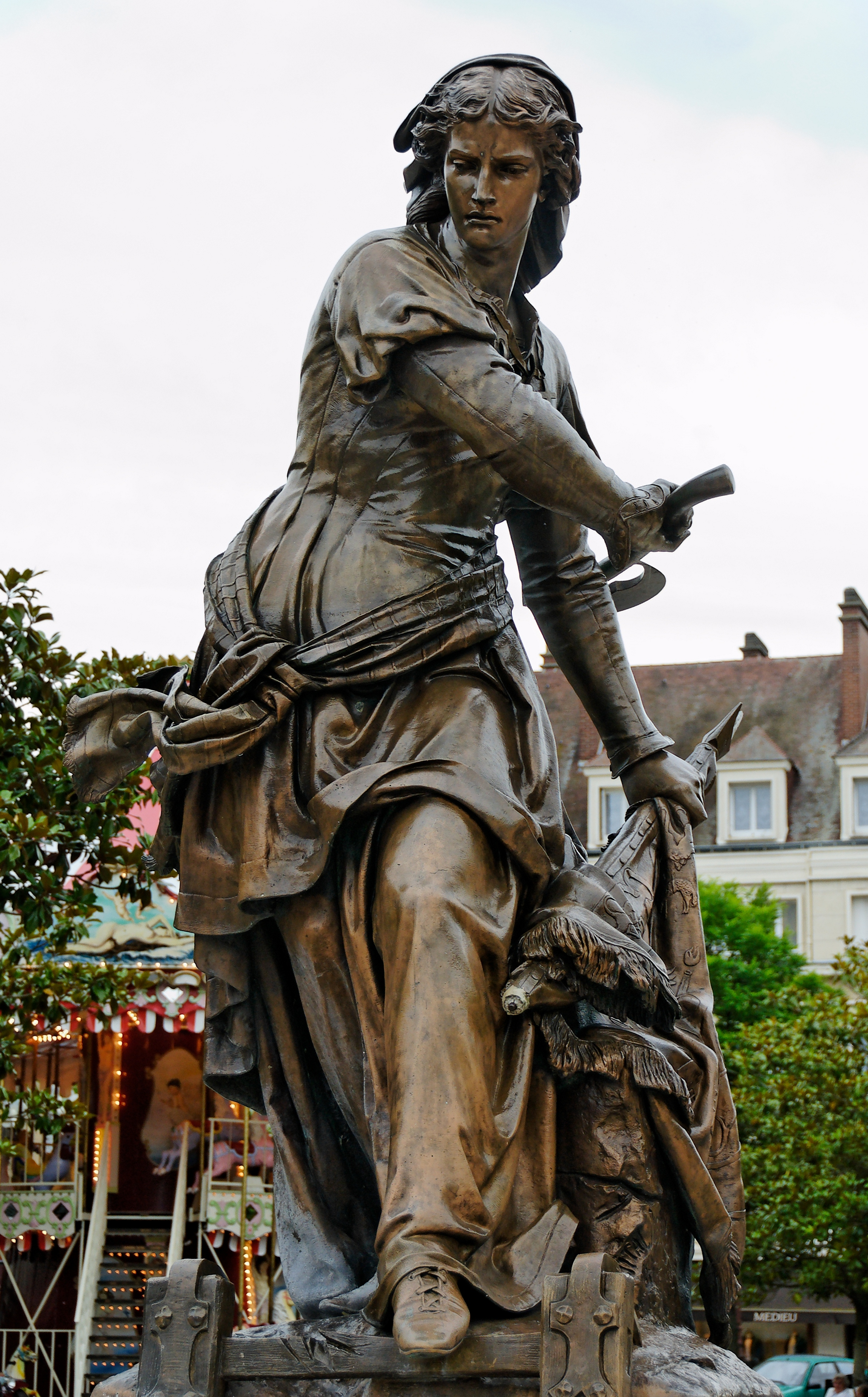
- Born: c. 1454
- Died: Unknown
- Known for: Heroic defence of the town of Beauvais in 1472
- Honours: Honoured by Louis XI

Jeanne Laisné, also known as Jeanne Fourquet in the 16th century and better known as Jeanne Hachette ("Joan the Hatchet"), is an emblematic figure in the history of the French city of Beauvais's resistance to the siege laid by Charles the Bold, Duke of Burgundy. She is said to have helped to repel a Burgundian attack on the town of Beauvais with a hatchet and, in popular history, has been elevated to the rank of French heroine. She was born in Beauvais around 1454 and died on an unknown date. The details of her life, and even the fact of her existence, have been the subject of debate among historians, although several contemporaneous documents refer to her existence.

== Life story and the siege of Beauvais ==
Jeanne Hachette is said to have been born in what is now rue Jeanne-Hachette in the city of Beauvais. She was the daughter of Mathieu Laisnéa, a bourgeois and, according to some historians, a former senior officer of the palace guards of Louis XI who was killed at the Battle of Montlhéry in 1465. However, popular tradition has it that Hachette used her mother's name.

The siege of Beauvais in 1472 was a military operation launched by Charles the Bold against the King of France, Louis XI, following the latter's breach of the agreements concluded at Péronne in 1468. Charles had superior financial resources, more soldiers and better artillery than Louis XI, but his troops were harassed by the royal army and exhausted themselves by attacking small strongholds before turning to the much larger town of Beauvais.

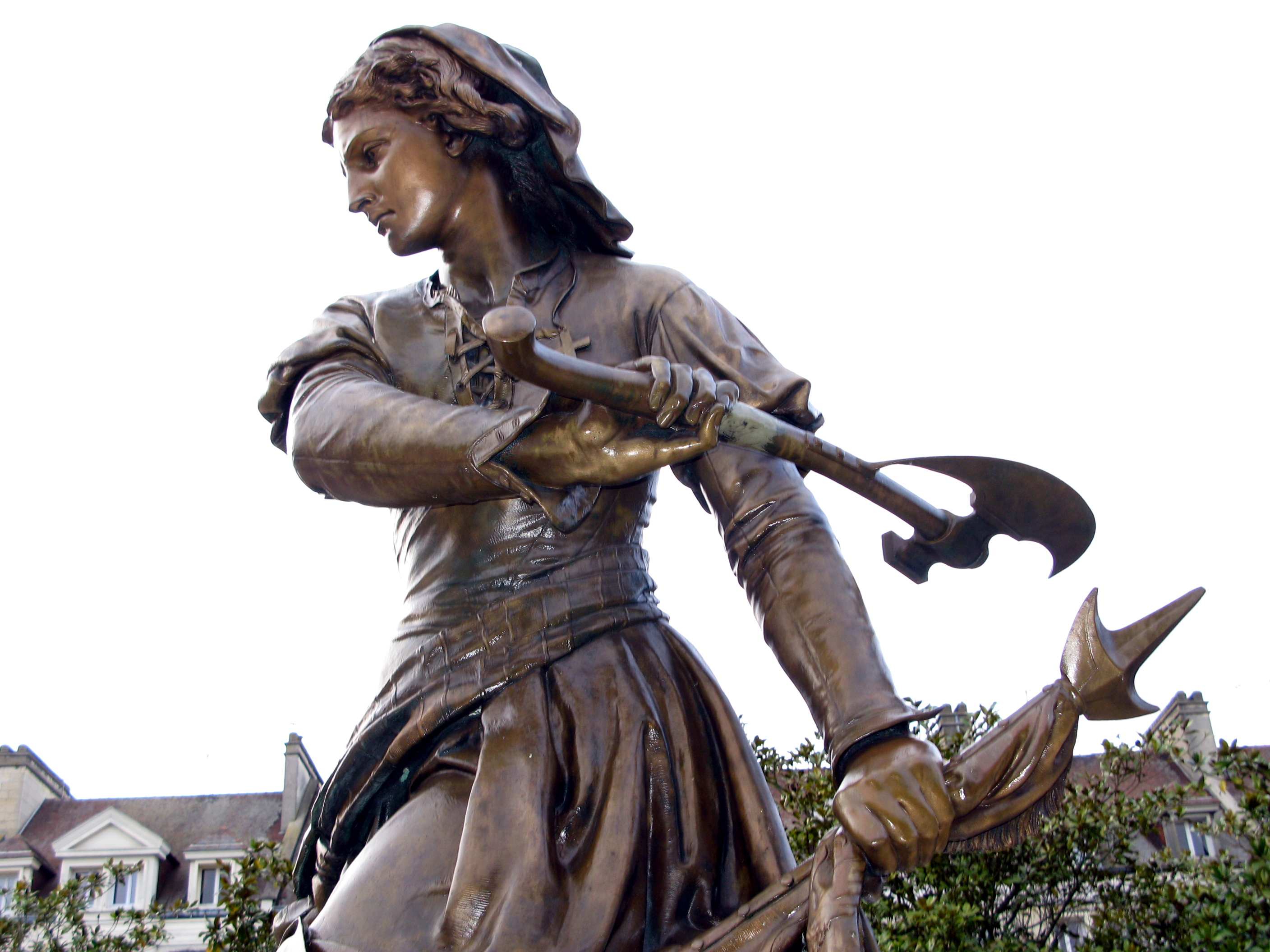
Another view of Gabriel-Vital Dubray's statue of Jeanne Hachette in Beauvais

Charles laid siege to Beauvais on June 27, 1472. During a Burgundian attack on July 22, Jeanne Hachette is said to have wielded an axe to push back a Burgundian who had planted a flag on the battlements. Axe in hand, Jeanne Hachette flung herself upon him, hurled him into the moat, tore down the flag, and revived the flagging courage of the defenders. Emboldened, the women of the city brought gunpowder and weapons to the fighters and may also have fought on the ramparts. Thus, the 80,000 Burgundian attackers were repulsed on July 22, and Charles the Bold's advance was prevented outright.

Louis XI's well-organised army had already succeeded in cutting the Burgundians' supply lines. Nevertheless, the citizens of Beauvais were forced to defend their city for almost a month and, ultimately, forced the enemy to retreat. This success demonstrated that the bourgeoisie, including women, could organise a defence of a royal city without the support of the royal army.

In gratitude for this heroic deed, Louis XI allowed the city of Beauvais to form a municipal corporation and exempted it from taxes. He also praised the heroic efforts of the women of Beauvais and allowed them to wear whatever clothes and ornaments they liked, regardless of rank (despite the laws that permitted certain attire to be worn only by noble women). He also instituted a procession in Beauvais to celebrate its victory over the Burgundians. On this occasion, women were to precede men in the procession. These authorisations were directly given, first in June 1473, by order of Louis XI. He also authorised the marriage of Jeanne Hachette to her chosen lover, Colin Pilon, while also bestowing favours on them.

== Debate about the existence of Jeanne Hachette ==
At the time of the canonisation of Joan of Arc in 1920, interest in the deeds of Jeanne Hachette was reactivated by republicans wishing to promote secularism – Jeanne Hachette offered a non-denominational counterpart to Joan of Arc. Historians agreed that the action of the women of Beauvais was decisive in obtaining victory, but, beginning in the 19th century, some historians (mainly those with religious leanings) questioned the authenticity of the exploits attributed specifically to Jeanne Hachette.

In an article entitled "The rumours of history. Jeanne Hachette" and appearing in the newspaper L'Assemblée nationale on February 19, 1850, the scholar Paulin Paris denied the existence of Hachette. He asserted, incorrectly, that no 15th-century author spoke of her and that the first work to report on her exploits was the History of Navarre by André Favin, published in 1612.

In reality, both her name and descriptions of her exploits are found in several authoritative 15th-century documents. These include historical accounts written soon after the siege of Beauvais and, in particular, the reliable chronicle by Robert Gaguin, Compendium super Francorum gestis (1497). In addition, several royal proclamations (lettres patentes) attest to the reality of the military exploits of the women of Beauvais and, indeed, to Laisné's very existence.

The most pertinent of these are the letters patent of Louis XI, sent in 1474 that explicitly refer to Jeanne Hachette, laud her exploits, and authorize her marriage to Colin Pilon. A decree issued by Louis XI's financial officials, shortly afterwards, gives substance to this royal proclamation by exempting the couple (both of whom are named explicitly) from present or future royal taxes.

== Legacy ==
=== Public commemorations ===
These are the physical places and civic markers where Laisné's memory remains visible in Beauvais.

- A statue of Jeanne Hachette was inaugurated in Beauvais in 1851, during a ceremony that included a recitation by the local poet Fanny Dénoix des Vergnes.
- The city's main square, the Place Jeanne-Hachette, is named in her honour and commemorates her role in the defense of Beauvais (19th century).
- Rue Jeanne-Hachette, also named for her, is one of the principal streets in the historic centre of Beauvais.
- A bust of Jeanne Hachette is displayed in the Beauvais Hôtel de Ville as part of the city's civic commemorations.
- Additional cast busts were created for regional museums in northern France, reflecting wider interest in her legacy.

=== Festivals and annual celebrations ===
These events maintain Laisné's story as a living part of community identity.

- The Fêtes Jeanne Hachette (also known as the Assault Festivals) have taken place each year on the last weekend of June since the 19th century. The celebrations include historical parades organized by the association Les Amis des Fêtes Jeanne Hachette.

=== Visual and material culture ===
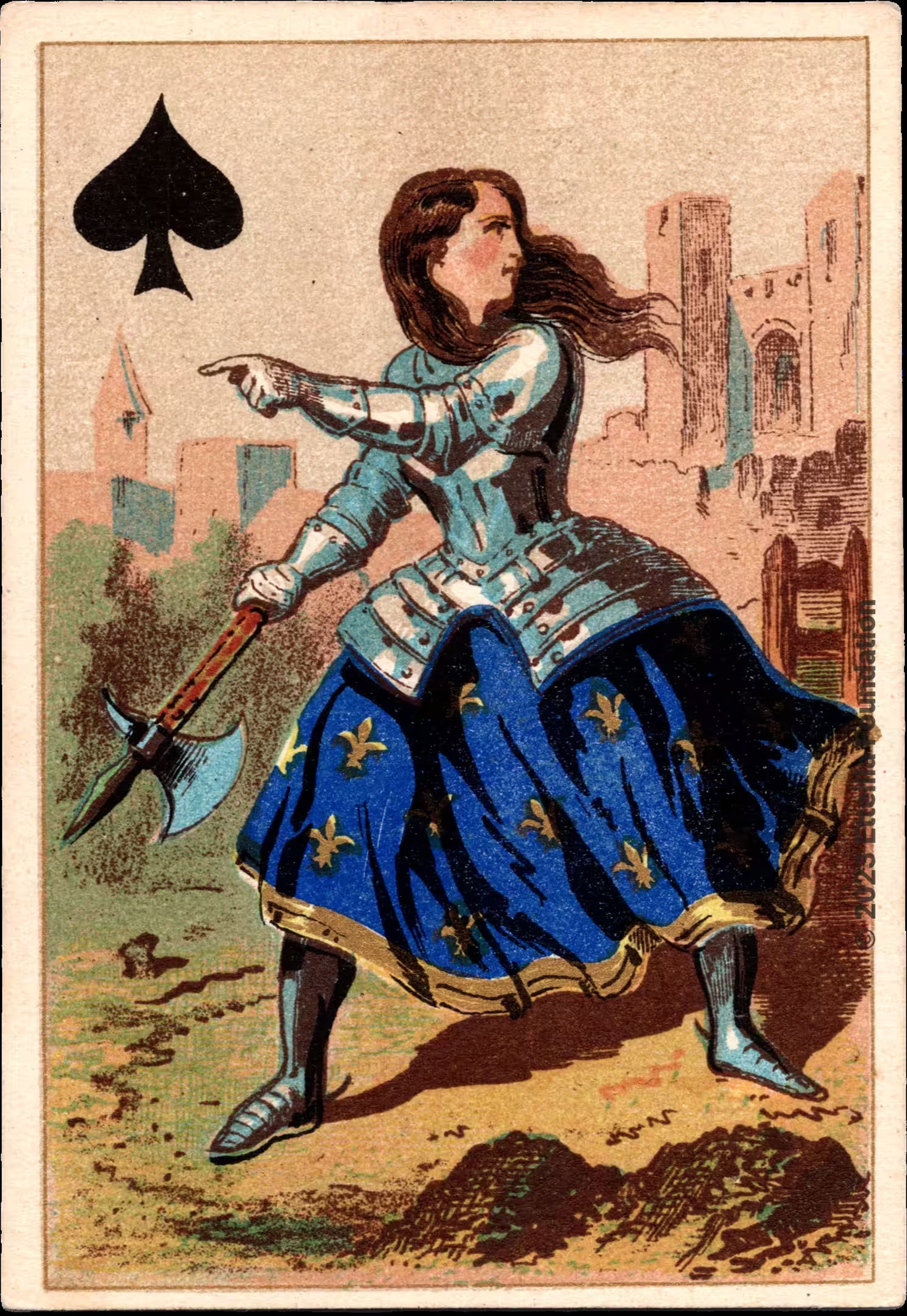
Jeanne Hachette portrayed as the queen of spades

These artworks and objects show how Laisné's image circulated in popular and artistic traditions.

- Engravings depicting the siege of Beauvais were widely produced throughout the 18th and 19th centuries, often showing Jeanne Hachette repelling Burgundian soldiers.
- She appears as the queen of spades in a transformation playing card deck printed by Grimaud and issued in 1860.
- A second depiction of her as the queen of spades appears in a transformation deck printed by Formmann and released in 1872.
- Max Ernst created the collage Jeanne Hachette et Charles le Téméraire in 1927; it is now held by the Cleveland Museum of Art under the English title Jean Hatchet and Charles the Bold.
- Local fundraising labels and philatelic designs used in Beauvais during the early 20th century also featured her image.

=== Performing and narrative arts ===
These works retell or reinterpret Laisné's story across theatre, film, and literature.

- The Marquis de Sade published the play Jeanne Laisné ou le Siège de Beauvais in 1813, although it was never staged (1813).
- Jeanne Hachette was portrayed in the historical film Le Miracle des loups, directed by Raymond Bernard and released in 1924.
- In contemporary fiction, the character Jenavelle Rolantir in Joseph Robert Lewis's novel Elf Saga: Doomsday draws inspiration from Jeanne Hachette and other French heroic figures (2014).

== See also ==
- List of woman warriors in legend and mythology
