= Minuscule 75 =

- New Testament manuscript
- Name: Codex Genevensis 19
- Text: Gospels
- Date: 11th century
- Script: Greek
- Now at: Bibliothèque de Genève
- Size: 21.6 cm by 16 cm
- Type: Byzantine text-type
- Category: V
- Note: close to minuscule 6 full marginalia

Minuscule 75 (in the Gregory-Aland numbering), ε 176 (von Soden), known as Codex Genevensis, is a Greek minuscule manuscript of the New Testament, on parchment leaves. Palaeographically it has been assigned to the 11th century. The codex has complex contents. It was adapted for liturgical use. It has complex contents, and full marginalia.

== Description ==
The codex contains the complete text of the four Gospels on 484 leaves (size 21.6 cm by 16 cm). The text is written in one column per page, 19 lines per page. The initial letters in red. Two paper leaves were added in the 16th century at the end of the codex.

The text is divided according to the κεφαλαια (chapters), whose numbers are given at the margin, and their τιτλοι (tiles of chapters) at the top of the pages. There is also another division according to the Ammonian Sections (in Matthew 359, in Mark 236 - 16:13, in Luke 342, in John 232 sections), with references to the Eusebian Canons.

It contains the Epistula ad Carpianum, the Eusebian Canon tables, Prolegomena, tables of the κεφαλαια (tables of contents) before each Gospel, lectionary markings at the margin (for liturgical use), and pictures.

== Text ==
The Greek text of the codex is a representative of the Byzantine text-type. Hermann von Soden classified it to the textual family K^{x}. Aland placed it in Category V. Textually it is close to minuscule 6. According to the Claremont Profile Method it belongs to the textual cluster 1167, and creates textual pair with 2229.

== History ==
In 1702 Leger presented the manuscript to the Library in Geneva. It was seen in 1714 by Wettstein, collated by Scholz, Cellérier, and Henri Omont (as Evv. 1). Gregory saw the manuscript in 1883. Hoskier gave a collation of the codex.

It is currently housed in the Bibliothèque de Genève (Gr. 19), in Geneva.

== See also ==
- List of New Testament minuscules
- Biblical manuscript
- Textual criticism
