= Fanny Dénoix des Vergnes =

French poet and writer

Fanny Dénoix
- Born: Marie-Françoise Descampeaux; 5 May 1798; Luchy (Oise), France
- Died: 17 January 1879 (aged 80); Beauvais, France
- Other name: Fanny Dénoix des Vergnes
- Occupations: Writer, Poet
- Spouse(s): Mr. Lavergnat and Mr. Dénoix des Vergnes
- Parents: Jean-Françoise Descampeaux (father); Marie-Jeanne Boutielle (mother)
- Honours: Named "Muse of the Oise"

Fanny Dénoix or Fanny Dénoix des Vergnes (1798-1879) was a French poet and writer who was lauded as "the muse of the Oise," the site of her well known poem, Jeanne Hachette, or the siege of Beauvais.

== Biography ==
Fanny was born Marie-Françoise Descampeaux, in Luchy (Oise), France on May 5, 1798. Her father was Jean-Françoise Descampeaux and her mother, Marie-Jeanne Boutielle. Her father was the tutor for one of the sons of King Louis XV. From an early age, Fanny loved literature, preferring "the reveries of solitude to the distractions of the world."

Married first to Mr. Lavergnat, Fanny married a second time on 16 February 1818 to Mr. Dénoix des Vergnes, surgeon of the Royal Guard dragoons. From 1832 on, she published collections of poems under the name of Fanny Dénoix, Fanny Denoix (without the accent, which corresponds to the local pronunciation of her name) or Fanny Dénoix des Vergnes.

=== Correspondent ===
Dénoix corresponded with many French intellectuals of the time including, Victor Hugo, Chateaubriand, Eugène Sue and Alphonse de Lamartine.

On 29 June 1832, as Dénoix was just exploring her poetic aspirations, she learned that the famed writer, François-René de Chateaubriand, had been imprisoned. According to an account by Countess Amable Tastu, Dénoix "flew to Paris, entered the hotel of the police prefecture, and despite the most severe orders, obstacles constantly raised, refusals a thousand times repeated, she reached the dungeon of the illustrious prisoner. Thrilled with confusion, emotion, happiness, she could finally contemplate the august features of the author of Rene, hearing the sound of his immortal voice and savoring the touching expression of his gratitude. Full of inexpressible delight, she returned to her province, exclaiming: "This day is the most beautiful of my life!" A correspondence ensued with the famed writer answering "in the most generous way." Some of those letters have been preserved.

=== Poet and writer ===
In 1833, Dénoix published a poem, Jeanne Hachette, or the siege of Beauvais winning an award at the Toulouse Floral Games, and was described as a "young woman with born talent." In 1837, she published Why I am a Poet: To my detractors in the Memoirs of the Academy of Sciences, Letters and Arts of Amiens.

Dénoix produced her first poetry collection in 1837, Hours of Solitude, and perhaps her most ambitious endeavor was to translate into verse the Mysteries of Paris by Eugène Sue (1843). After the 1848 French revolution, Fanny Dénoix became actively involved in politics, publishing an ode to the army (1850), a collection of patriotic verses (1855), and a salute to Pierre-Joseph Proudhon (1858).

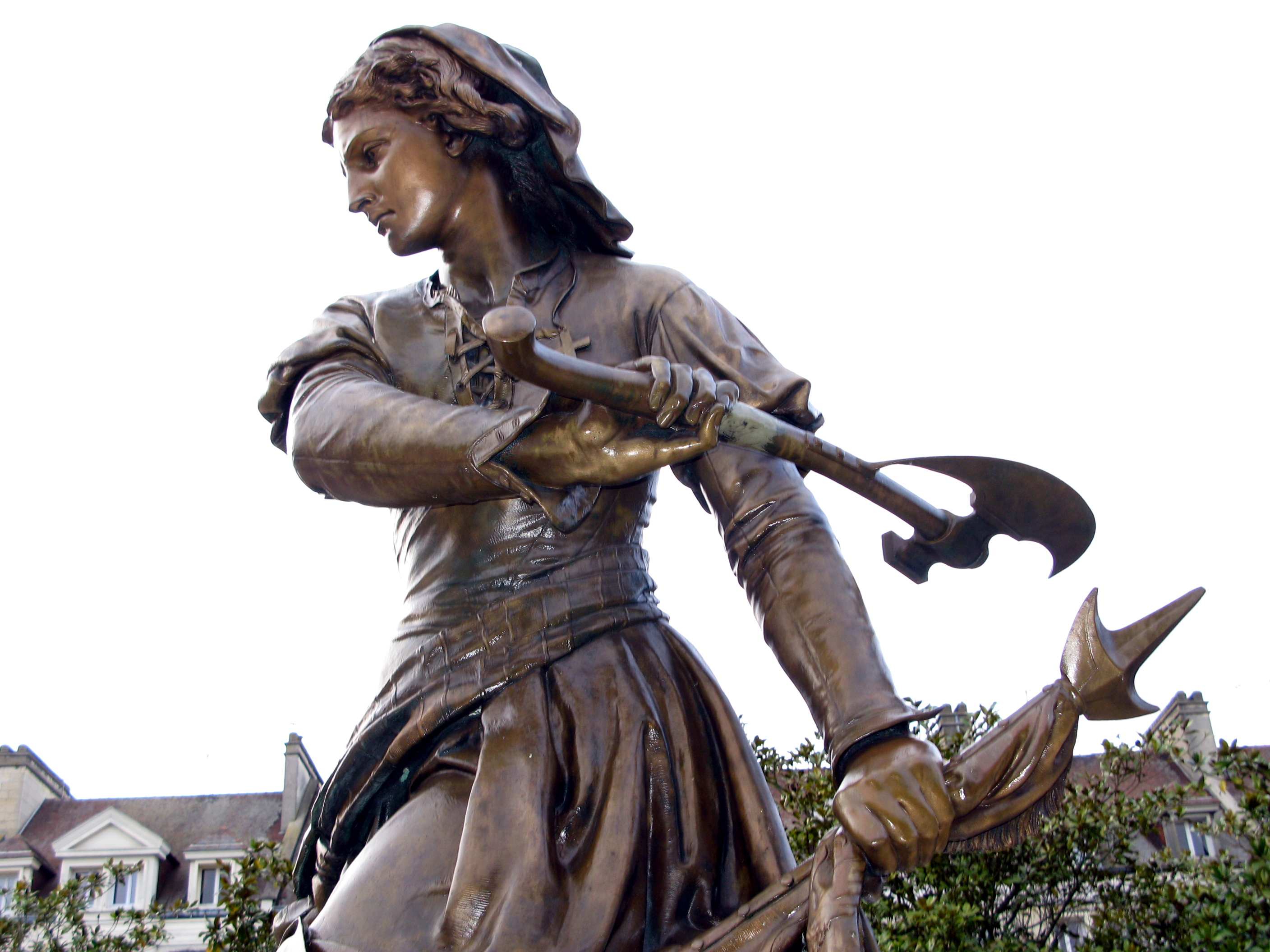
Statue in Beauvais of the city's 1472 heroine, Jeanne Hachette.

In 1851, in Beauvais, on the occasion of the erection of the statue to Jeanne Hachette (who was being honoured for her heroism in 1472), Dénoix read her renown poem about the heroine using "flaming stanzas that were reflected on the lips of the 'Muse de l'Oise,' with a superhuman enthusiasm." On that same occasion, the author bequeathed to the city the substantial sum of 5,000 francs with the stipulation that the interest would be awarded every four years to deserving poets. (To put that sum in perspective, in 1831, a working-class family could rent a small house for about 40 francs a year.) She took that opportunity to make the first awards: Paul Dupont-Sevres (200 fr), the unnamed author of a Latin poem "Ode to Jeanne Hachette" (200 fr.), and Laçroix de a Neuville-en-Ilez (100 fr). The prizes were awarded 1880-1914, ceasing with World War I.

=== Congress member ===
Dénoix was a contributor to Flandre Illustrée and a member of several intellectual societies, notably the 1853 scientific congress, for which she authored a poem, To the city of Arras. According to Gerson, she was one of only three female members of the congress among 421 men. He notes that "women published less than two percent of historical monographs between 1866 and 1875, for instance. Their subordinate role in this patrimonial field suggests that they struggled to impose themselves within an amateurish realm that participated in a broader program of political exclusion."

=== Death ===
Dénoix died in Beauvais, France on 17 January 1879, at about 82 years of age.

== Honors ==
- Awarded an honorable mention of the Academy of Floral Games of Toulouse for Jeanne Hachette, or the seat of Beauvais
- Received an honorable mention from the Philotechnical Society, The Universal Exhibition, April 1868
- A street in the city of Beauvais (Rue Denoix des Vergnes) near the Jeu de Paume was named after her in 1882. The plaque on display there spells her name Denoix, without an accent.

== Selected works ==
Among her many books, poems and letters, the author's name is spelled Dénoix or Denoix (without the accent).

- The Holly Fountain, by Fanny Dénoix
- Jeanne Hachette, or the siege of Beauvais, a poem by Fanny Denoix
- The Brothers of Christian doctrine in Beauvais, letter to the Progress of the Somme by Fanny Denoix Vergnes
- Gisors-Neauffles, by Fanny Dénoix
- To Napoleon III, by Fanny Dénoix des Vergnes
- To HM the Empress of Mexico, by Fanny Dénoix des Vergnes
- Jefferson Davis before the High Court of Justice, by Fanny Dénoix des Vergnes
- M. de Cavour, by Fanny Dénoix des Vergnes
- To Victor Hugo, by Fanny Dénoix des Vergnes
- The Return, by Fanny Dénoix des Vergnes
- Without fear and without reproach, poetry, by Fanny Dénoix des Vergnes
- Hours of solitude, poems by Fanny Denoix, 1837
- The Council, letters written in the Journal d'Amiens, by Fanny Dénoix des Vergnes
- Warriors and sentimental, poems by Fanny Denoix
- Honor to you! Virtues, Courage, Glory, by Fanny Dénoix des Vergnes
- Mysteries of Paris (from the novel Les Mystères de Paris by Eugène Sue), poem, by Fanny Dénoix, 1843
- Compiègne, La Forêt, by Fanny Dénoix / Fanny Dénoix des Vergnes
- Pierrefonds, by Fanny Dénoix
- To the French Army, by Fanny Dénoix des Vergnes, 1850
- Heart and Country, by Fanny Dénoix des Vergnes, 1855
- Floods, by Fanny Dénoix des Vergnes, 1856
- Cancan, by Fanny Dénoix des Vergnes, 1857
- Stances, poem (for the inauguration of the Beauvais railway ), 1857
- Beauvais, by Fanny Vergnes Denoix, 1858
- Toby, Dog of Muse, to Milord, Dog of Czar, by Fanny Dénoix des Vergnes, 1865
- Here and there, Historical Studies (including Visit to Monsieur de Chateaubriand), by Fanny Dénoix des Vergnes, 1865
- Let the justice of a woman, by Fanny Vergnes Denoix (sic), 1866
- My Politics, by Fanny Dénoix des Vergnes, 1867
