= Master Honoré =

French artist and illuminator

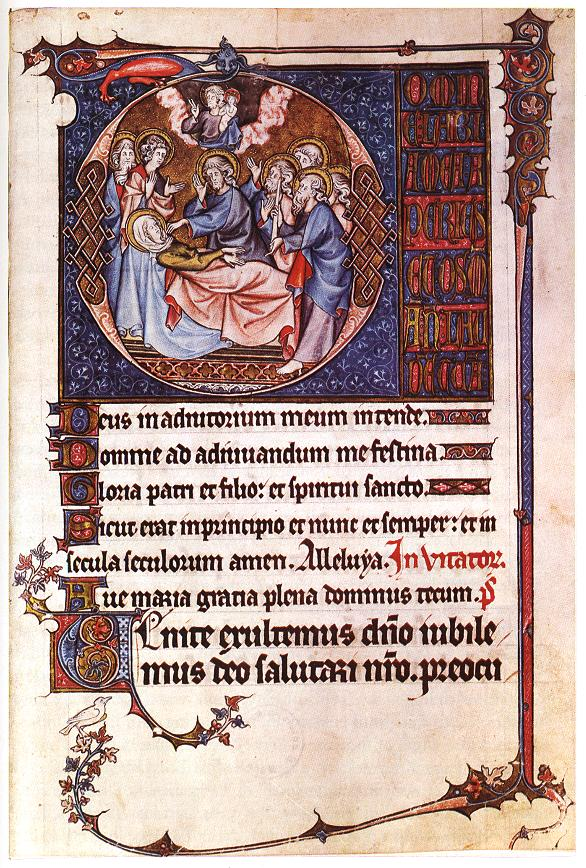
Book of Hours by Master Honoré, circa 1290, Stadtbibliothek, Nuremberg

Master Honoré was a Parisian secular artist who produced Gothic-era illuminated manuscripts for the French monarchy, particularly Philip the Fair. He is considered sculptural in the design of his figures, even capturing the light as it plays on their bodies. His workshop was on the street known today as rue Boutebrie. Master Honoré lived and worked in Paris for the court of Phillip the Fair from 1288 until 1318.

Until the 13th century illuminated manuscripts were predominantly created by monks in the scriptoria of monasteries. The 13th century saw a move away from monastic production to a manufacture of books by lay masters in commercial workshops. Master Honoré was one such lay artisan, and one of the few whose actual name survives. In 1295 Master Honoré designed the miniatures in the Prayer Book of Philip the Fair. His figures are larger and have a relief-like modeling that seems more realistic. The Parisian school of manuscript painting saw innovations of representational realism by Master Honoré; his successor within the workshop was Jean Pucelle.

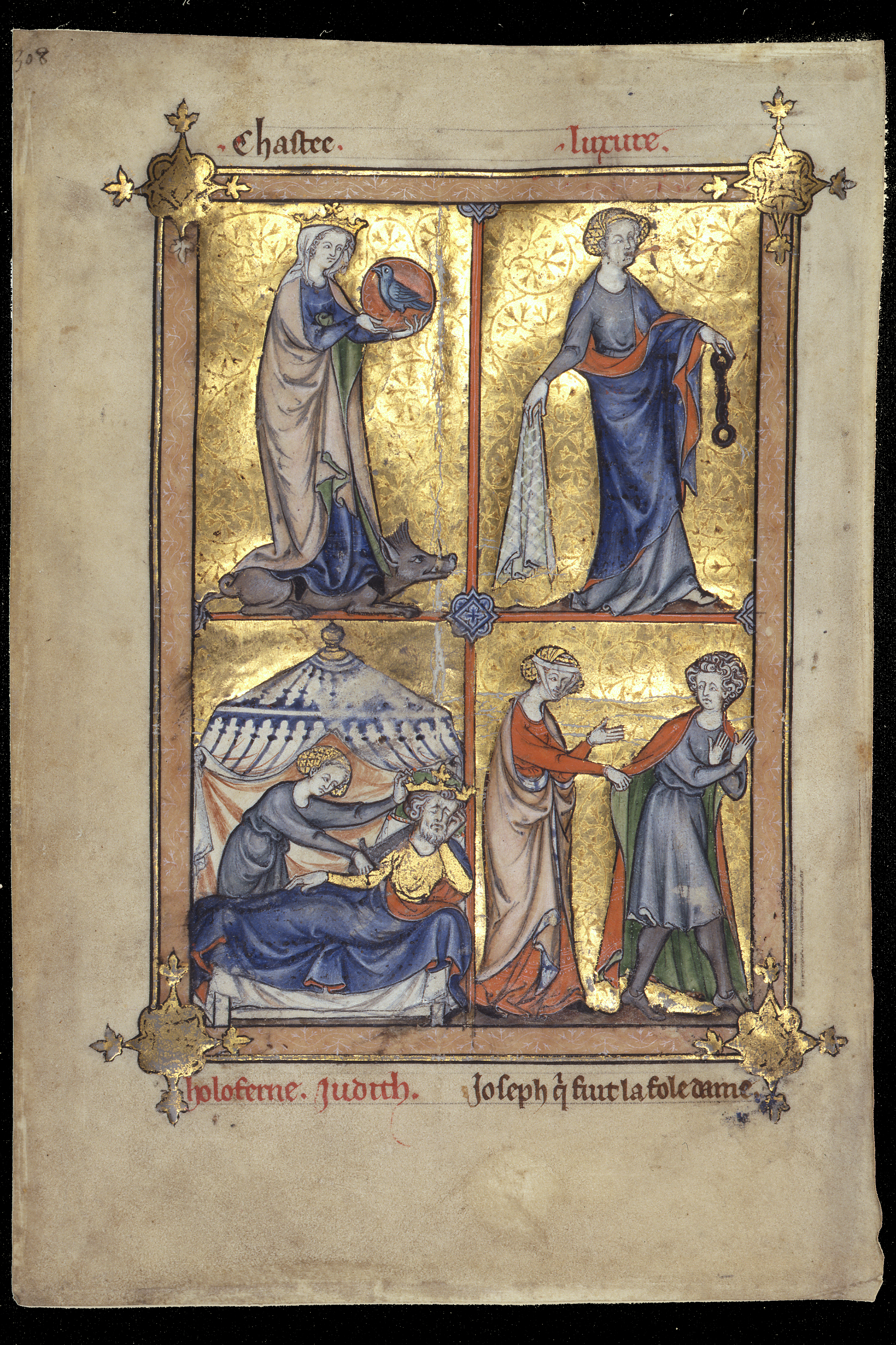
Miniature from La Somme le Roy, circa 1295, Fitzwilliam Museum, Cambridge (MS 368)
