= Robert Gaguin =

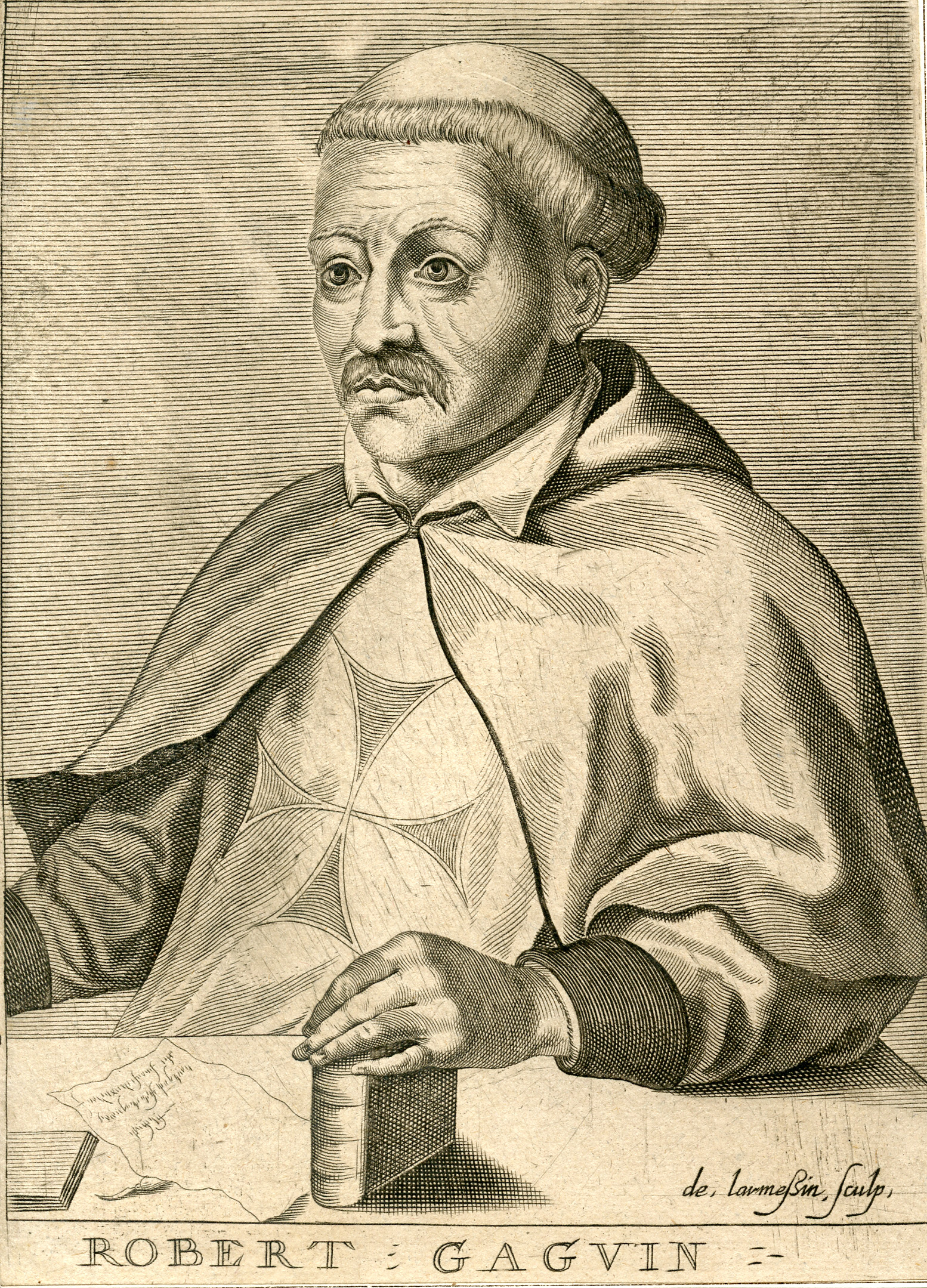
Robert Gaguin; 17th century engraving by Nicolas III de Larmessin

Robert Gaguin (older spelling: Robert Guaguin; winter of 1433/34 – May 22, 1501) was a noted French Renaissance humanist and philosopher; he was a minister general of the Trinitarian Order.

== Biography ==
He was born at Calonne-sur-la-Lys near Béthune in what was the county of Flanders and the Duchy of Burgundy. He and his brother Christophe lost their father at an early age, and his mother placed him in the Trinitarian convent of Préavin, where he began his studies. He later attended the University of Paris.

He was an influential humanist who was a friend of Publio Fausto Andrelini from Forlì, an associate of Erasmus and a student of Gregory Tifernas.

In his later years, he published a reformation of the statues of the Trinitarian Order on August 30, 1497. He died in Paris on May 22, 1501, at the age of 67, and was interred at the church of the convent of the Trinitarians.

He also translated several works from Latin to Middle French, including Caesar's Gallic Wars, which was published in Paris in 1485 by Antoine Vérard; works from the third decade of Titus Livius; and Giovanni Pico della Mirandola's Conseils prouffitables contre les ennuis et tribulations du monde in 1498. He translated Alain Chartier's Curial into Latin from Middle French in 1473.

== Works ==
- Epistole et orationes
- Rerum gallicarum annales, History of France
- Chronicle of the General Ministers of the Order of the Holy Trinity.

== See also ==
- French Renaissance
- List of ministers general of the Trinitarian Order
- Jeanne Hachette

== Bibliography ==
- Louis Thuasne (ed.), Roberti Gaguini Epistole et orationes, Paris, Bibliothèque littéraire de la Renaissance, Émile Bouillon, 1903
- Sylvie Charrier, Recherches sur l'oeuvre latine en prose de Robert Gaguin (1433-1501), Paris, H. Champion, 1996.
- Franck Collard, Un historien au travail à la fin du XVe siècle: Robert Gaguin, Geneva, Droz (Travaux d'humanisme et Renaissance, CCCI), 1996.
