= Silvestro dei Gherarducci =

Italian painter

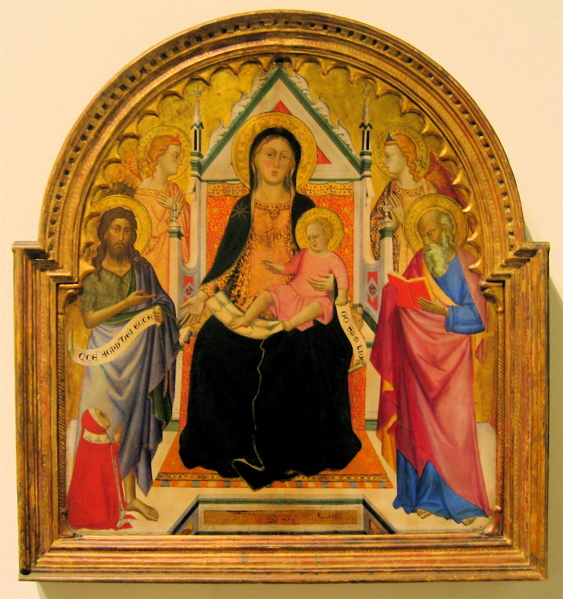
Don Silvestro dei Gherarducci's painting of Madonna and Child, tempera on panel

Silvestro dei Gherarducci (c. 1339 – c. 1399) was an Italian painter and illuminator in Florence. He became a monk and later a prior of the monastery of Santa Maria degli Angeli where he first started work on illustrations for manuscripts.

== Paintings ==
- Madonna and Child with Sts. John Baptist and Paul (?), circa 1375, tempera on panel, 83.82 × 76.835 cm (Los Angeles County Museum of Art, M.39.1)
- Assumption of the Virgin, circa 1365, tempera on panel, 41 × 27 cm (Pinacoteca Vaticana)
- Madonna and Child, circa 1365–1370, tempera on panel, 49 × 30.5 cm (private collection)
- The Assumption of Saint Mary Magdalene, 1380s, tempera on panel, 161.1 × 81.9 cm (National Gallery of Ireland, Dublin, NGI.841)
- Madonna and Child, circa 1366–1375, tempera on panel, 164 × 89 cm (Galleria dell'Accademia, Florence, inv. 3161)
- The Madonna and Child, tempera on panel, 30.5 × 20.3 cm (The Legion of Honor, Fine Arts Museums of San Francisco, 1999.32)

== Illuminated manuscripts ==
=== Gradual from Santa Maria degli Angeli ===
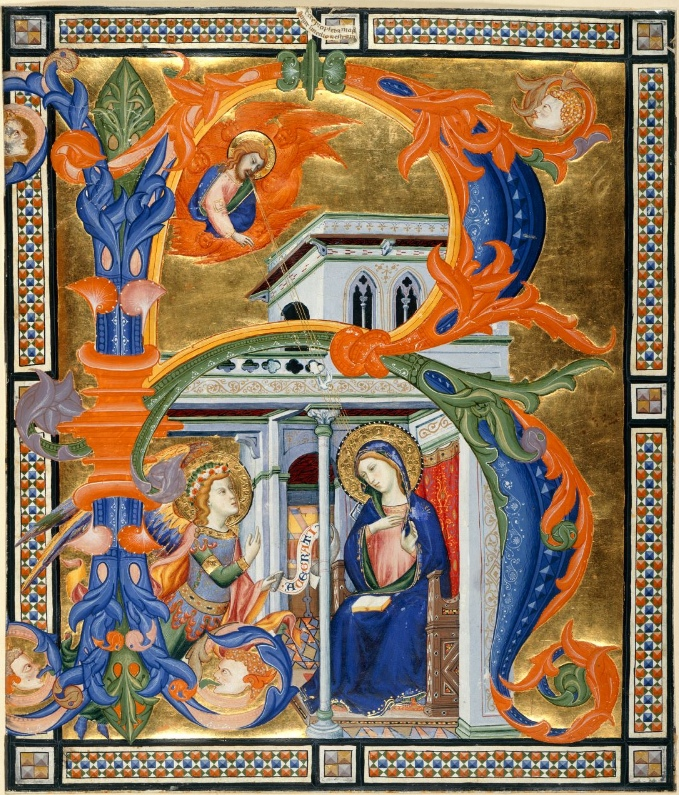
Initial "R", gradual from the monastery of Santa Maria degli Angeli

Gradual from Santa Maria degli Angeli, considered to be Don Silvestro's crowning achievement, is currently preserved in the Biblioteca Medicea Laurenziana in Florence (Codice Corale 2 / Cod. Cor. 2), with twenty detached pages in various collections around the world:

- folio 15: Saint Stephen Enthroned in an Initial E (private collection, England)
- folio 18: The Four Evangelists in an Initial I (Calouste Gulbenkian Museum, Lisbon, inv. no. M34)
- folio 23: Saint Silvester in an Initial S (Nationalmuseum, Stockholm, NMB 1797)
- folio 32: Saint Agnes in an Initial M (Library of Geneva, Switzerland)
- folio 42: The Presentation in the Temple in an Initial S (Fitzwilliam Museum, Cambridge, England, Marlay Cutting It. 13A)
- folio 49: Saint Scholastica in an Initial V (location unknown)
- folio 56: Saint Benedict Enthroned with Eight Saints (Calouste Gulbenkian Museum, inv. no. M35)
- folio 60: The Annunciation in an Initial R (British Library, London, Add. MS 35254 C) + Six Bust-Length Prophets (Nationalmuseum, Stockholm, NMB 1797)
- folio 80: Saint Michael Fighting the Dragon in an Initial B (Abegg-Stiftung^{(de)}, Riggisberg, Switzerland)
- folio 90: Saint Romuald Enthroned with Four Saints in an Initial O (British Library, Add. MS 37472, folio 3)
- folio 97: The Birth of Saint John the Baptist (Walker Art Gallery, Liverpool, inv. no. 2764)
- folio 104: Saints Peter and Paul in an Initial N (private collection, England)
- folio 113: Saint Margaret in an Initial L (private collection, Milan)
- folio 119: Saints James and Andrew in an Initial M (Nelson-Atkins Museum of Art, Kansas City, inv. no. F61–14)
- folio 134: Saint Lawrence in an Initial C (Walters Art Museum, Baltimore, MS W.416)
- folio 137: The Virgin and Child in an Initial S (Cleveland Museum of Art, 1924.1012)
- folio 142: The Death and Assumption of the Virgin (British Library, Add. MS 37955 A)
- folio 148: The Birth of the Virgin in an Initial G (Metropolitan Museum of Art, New York, 21.168)
- folio 155: The Virgin and Christ in Glory in an Initial G (Cleveland Museum of Art, 1930.105)
- folio 159: Pope Saint Clement in an Initial D (Fitzwilliam Museum, MS 5-1979)

=== Gradual 1 from San Michele a Murano ===
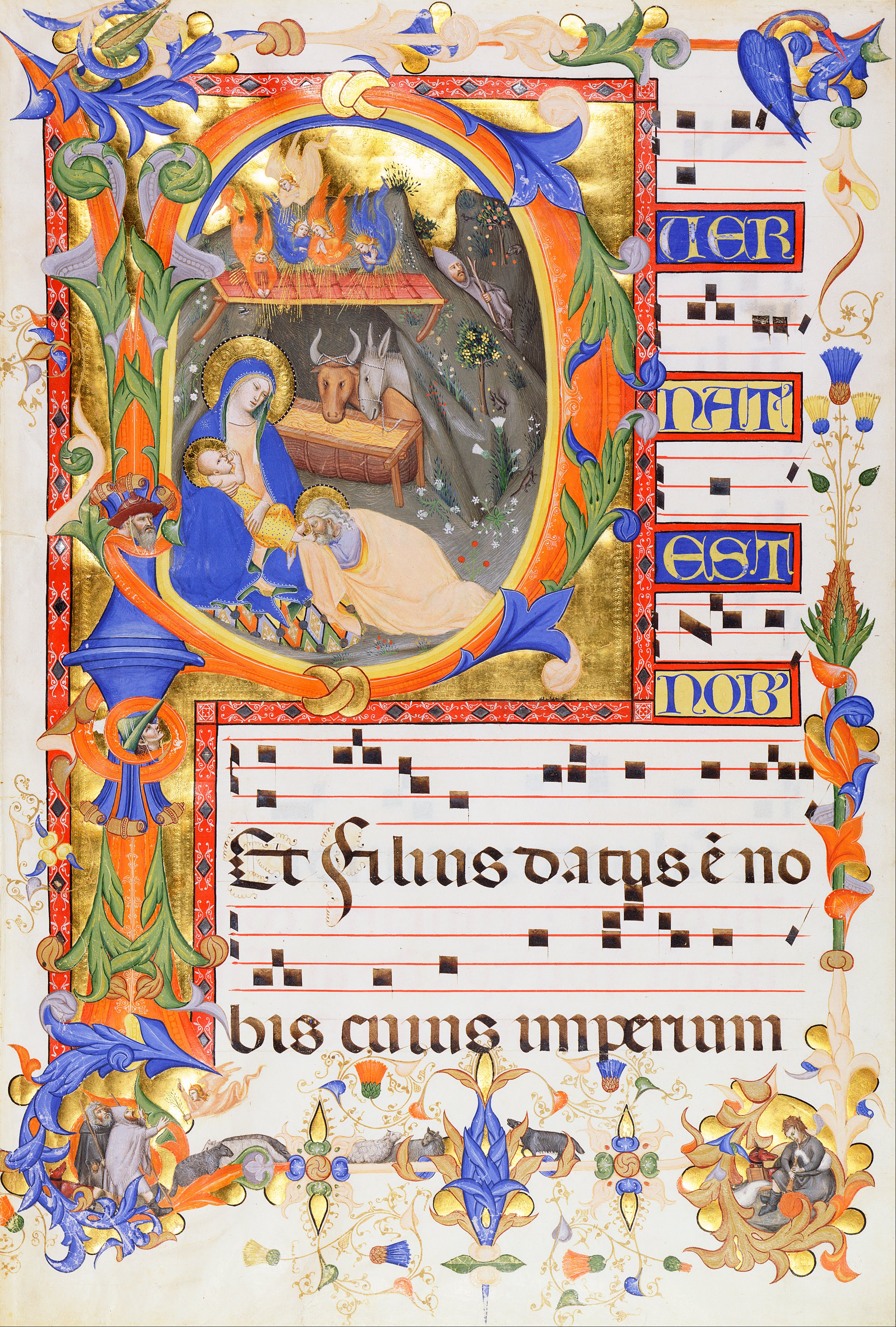
Initial "P", Gradual 1 from the monastery of San Michele a Murano

Gradual 1 from San Michele a Murano can be reconstructed from individual pages and numerous cuttings in various collections:

- folio 1: God the Father Presenting the Infant Christ to a group of Saints in an Initial A (Victoria and Albert Museum, London, MS 434, no. I 30-A)
- Saint Paul in an Initial G (Morgan Library & Museum, New York, MS M.478, no. 6 (I.3))
- Foliate Decoration in an Initial M (Victoria and Albert Museum, MS 983, no. 2868)
- folio 32: The Nativity of Christ in an Initial D (Victoria and Albert Museum, MS 966, no. 3074)
- The Adoration of the Shepherds in an Initial L (Victoria and Albert Museum, MS 967, no. D.229-1906)
- folio 38: The Nativity and the Annuciation to the Shepherds in an Initial P (Morgan Library & Museum, MS M.653, no. 1 (I.8))
- A Prophet in an Initial D (Victoria and Albert Museum, MS 973, no. D.222-1906)
- folio 46: The Adoration of the Magi in an Initial E (Morgan Library & Museum, MS M.653, no. 5 (I.15))
- A Prophet Looking Up to the Enthroned Christ in an Initial I (Morgan Library & Museum, MS M.478, no. 7 (I.16))
- A Prophet in an Initial O (Art Institute of Chicago, acc. no. 1915.550)
- A Prophet in an Initial A (Morgan Library & Museum, MS M.478, no. 10 (I.18))
- A Prophet in an Initial С (Victoria and Albert Museum, MS 976, no. D.227-1906)
- A Prophet in an Initial E (Victoria and Albert Museum, MS 982, no. D.219-1906)
- A Prophet in an Initial R (Museo Civico, Padua, M.C. 887)
- A Prophet in an Initial O (Victoria and Albert Museum, MS D.217-1906)
- An Initial I (Museo Civico, Padua, M.C. 886)
- The Entry into Jerusalem in an Initial D (Wildenstein Collection, Musée Marmottan, Paris)

=== Gradual 2 from San Michele a Murano ===
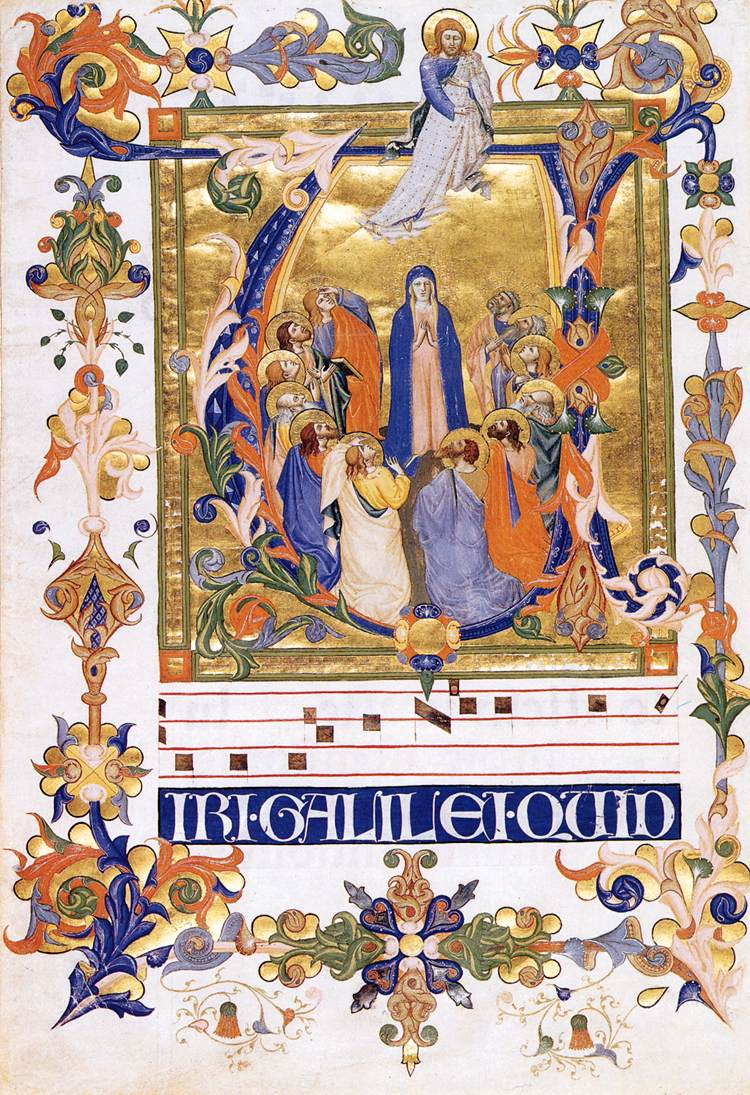
Initial "V", Gradual 2 from the monastery of San Michele a Murano

Gradual 2 from San Michele a Murano can be reconstructed from individual pages and numerous cuttings in various collections:

- The Resurrection in an Initial R (Musée Condé, Chantilly, France, inv. no. PE 2)
- A Prophet in an Initial A (Victoria and Albert Museum, MS 969, no. 432)
- A Prophet in an Initial V (Morgan Library & Museum, MS M.478, no. 17 (II.5))
- A Prophet in an Initial V (Victoria and Albert Museum, MS D.226-1906)
- A Prophet in an Initial E (Morgan Library & Museum, MS M.478, no. 3 (II.7))
- A Prophet in an Initial M (Morgan Library & Museum, MS M.478, no. 9 (II.10))
- An Initial I (Museo Civico, Padua, M.C. 878)
- A Prophet in an Initial C (Victoria and Albert Museum, MS 968, no. 431)
- A Prophet in an Initial V (Victoria and Albert Museum, MS 970, no. 3087)
- folio 44: The Ascention of Christ in an Initial V (Morgan Library & Museum, MS M.653, no. 3 (II.14))
- A Prophet in an Initial E (Morgan Library & Museum, MS M.478, no. 4 (II.15))
- folio 58: The Pentecost in an Initial S (Victoria and Albert Museum, MS 970, inv. no. 3045)
- A Prophet in an Initial A (Victoria and Albert Museum, MS 975, no. D.224-1906)
- A Prophet in an Initial R (Morgan Library & Museum, MS M.478, no. 14 (II.26))
- folio 74: The Trinity in an Initial B (Morgan Library & Museum, MS M.653, no. 2 (II.23))
- folio 78: The Last Supper in an Initial C (Morgan Library & Museum, MS M.653, no. 4 (II.25))
- A Prophet in an Initial D (Victoria and Albert Museum, MS 974, no. D.225-1906)
- A Prophet in an Initial D (Kupferstichkabinett, Berlin, MS 682)
- A Prophet in an Initial D (Victoria and Albert Museum, MS 981, no. D.221-1906)
- A Prophet in an Initial O (Morgan Library & Museum, MS M.478, no. 11 (II.31))
- A Prophet in an Initial S (Victoria and Albert Museum, MS 978, no. D.218-1906)
- A Prophet in an Initial E (Morgan Library & Museum, MS M.478, no. 5 (II.33))
- A Prophet in an Initial D (Morgan Library & Museum, MS M.478, no. 1 (II.35))
- A Prophet in an Initial D (Morgan Library & Museum, MS M.478, no. 2 (II.36))
- A Prophet in an Initial R (Morgan Library & Museum, MS M.478, no. 15 (II.37))
- A Prophet in an Initial P (Morgan Library & Museum, MS M.478, no. 13 (II.38))
- An Initial I (Museo Civico, Padua, M.C. 904)
- A Prophet in an Initial M (Morgan Library & Museum, MS M.478, no. 8 (II.40))
- An Initial I (Museo Civico, Padua, M.C. 879)
- A Prophet in an Initial D (Victoria and Albert Museum, inv. no. D.228-1906)
- A Prophet in an Initial S (Morgan Library & Museum, MS M.478, no. 16 (II.43))
- A Prophet in an Initial O (Morgan Library & Museum, MS M.478, no. 12 (II.44))
- A Prophet in an Initial I (Museo Civico, Padua, M.C. 880)
- A Prophet in an Initial D (Morgan Library & Museum, MS M.718, no. 18 (II.47))
- A Prophet in an Initial L (formerly, Victoria and Albert Museum, inv. no. D.220-1906; missing since the early 1940s)
- A Prophet in an Initial E (formerly, Victoria and Albert Museum, inv. no. D.223-1906; missing since the early 1940s)
- A Prophet in an Initial E (private collection, England)

=== Other works ===
- Saint Augustine in an Initial I (Biblioteca Medicea Laurenziana, Codice Corale 19 (Cod. Cor. 19), folio 149)
