= List of ministers general of the Trinitarian Order =

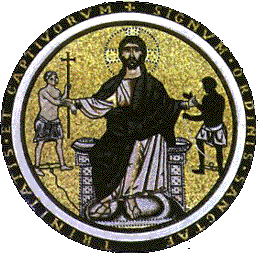
Shield of the Minister General of the Trinitarian Order.

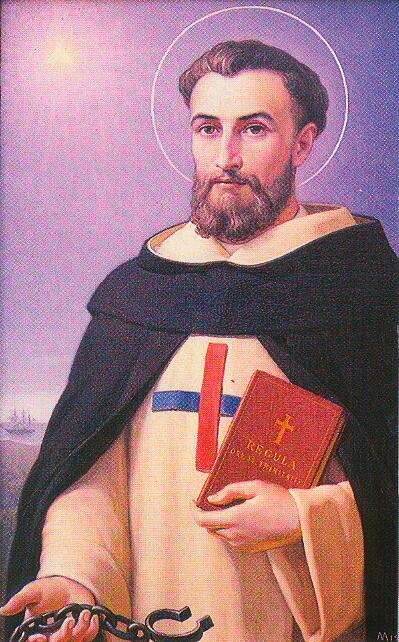
John de Matha was the first Minister General of the Order of Most Holy Trinity for Redemption of the Captives.

This is a list of the ministers general of the Order of the Most Holy Trinity for the Redemption of the Captives.

== Ministers General up to 1598 ==
- John de Matha, 1198 - 1213
- John the Englishman, 1214 - 1217
- William the Scot, 1217 - 1222
- Roger of Champagne, 1223 - 1227
- Michael the Spaniard, 1227 - 1230
- Nicolas, 1231 - 1257
- James of Flanders, 1257 - 1262
- Alard, 1262 - 1272
- Jean Boileau, 1272 - 1291
- Pierre de Cuisy, 1291 - 1315
- Bertraud, 1315 - 1324
- Jean Brunet, 1324 - 1337
- Thomas Loquet, 1337 - 1357
- Pedro de Bourry, 1357 - 1373
- Jean de La Marche, 1374 - 1392
- Renaud de La Marche, 1392 - 1410
- Thierry de Vareland, 1410 - 1413
- Étienne Mesnil-Fouchard, 1414 - 1415
- Pierre Chandoté, 1415 - 1420
- Jean Halboud de Troyes, 1421 - 1439
- Jean Thibaut, 1440 - 1460
- Raul Duvivier, 1460 - 1472
- Robert Gaguin, 1473 - 1501
- Guy Musnier, 1502 - 1508
- Nicholas Musnier, 1509 - 1545
- Thierry Musnier, 1546 - 1568
- Bernard of Metz or Dominici, 1570 - 1597
- François Petit, 1598 - 1612

== Ministers General of the Calced Trinitarians ==
- Louis Petit, 1612 - 1652
- Claude Ralle, 1652 - 1654
- Pierre Mercier, 1655 - 1683

=== For France ===
- Eustache Teissier, 1686 - 1693 Not confirmed by Innocent XI
- Grégoire de la Forge, 1693 - 1704

=== For the provinces outside France ===
- Antonio Pegueroles, 1688 - 1696
- José of Toledo, 1696 - 1700

=== For the entire Order ===
- Grégoire de La Forge, 1704 - 1706
- Claude Massac, 1706 - 1716 and 1716 - 1748
- Guillaume Lefèvre, 1749 - 1764
- François Pichault, 1765 - 1780
- Pierre Chauvier, 1781 - 1792
- Vacancy (1792-1805)
- Silvestre Calvo, 1805 - 1813
- Blas Sánchez, 1814 - 1824 (Vicar General)
- Pablo Hernández, 1825 - 1826
- Francisco Javier León, 1826 - 1831 (Vicar General)
- Francisco Martí, 1831 - 1853
- Segismundo Casas, 1853 - 05/11/1855 (Apostolic Commmissary)
- Antonio Martín Bienes, 1856 - 1894 (Apostolic Commissary)

== Ministers General of the Discalced Trinitarians ==
- Gabriel of the Assumption, 1631 - 1632
- Francisco of the Cross, 1632
- Isidoro of the St. John, 1632-1635 (Vicar General) 1635 - 1641 (Minister General)
- Diego of Jesus, 1641 - 1647
- Martín of the Assumption, 1647 - 1653
- Gaspar of Jesus, 06/05/1653 - 1656
- Diego of the Mother of God, 1656
- Leandro of the Bl. Sacrament, 1656 - 1662
- Francisco of the St. Julian, 1662 - 1663
- Pedro of the Ascension, 1663 (Vicar General) 1665 - 1671 (Minister General)
- Antonio of the Conception, 1671 - 1677
- Antonio of the Holy Spirit, 1677 - 1678
- Miguel of the Jesus and Mary, 1678 - 1680 (Vicar General)
- Antonio of the Conception, 1680 - 1685
- Pedro of the St. Michael, 1685 - 1686 (Vicar General) 1686 - 1692 (Minister General)
- Rafael of St. John, 1692 - 1693
- Juan of St. Anthony, 1693 - 1695 (Vicar General) 1695 - 1701 (Minister General)
- Juan of St. Athanasius, 1701 - 1707
- Juan of St. Paul, 1707 - 1716
- Alejandro of the Conception, 1716 - 1739
- Miguel of St. Francis, 1739 - 1740 (Vicar General)
- José of the Ascension, 1740 - 1747
- Miguel of St. St. Joseph, 1747 - 1750
- Rodrigo of St. Laureano, 1750 - 1753 (Vicario General)
- Stanislaw of the Bl. Sacrament, 1753 - 1759
- Gaspar of. St. Thomas Aquinas, 1759 - 1763
- Francisco of St. Albert, 1763 - 1765 (Vicar General)
- Rudolf of St. John Nepucene, 1765 - 1771
- Gudisalvo of the Nativity, 1771 - 1776
- Francisco of St. Michael, 1776 - 1778 (Vicar General)
- Leo of the Ascension, 1778 - 1783

In 1783 the general administration of the Order was divided between a Minister General for Spain and Vicar General or second Minister General for the rest of the Order.

- José of the Ascension, 1783 - 1785
- José of St. John Baptist, 1785 - 1789 (Vicar General)
- Juan of Our Lady of Mt. Carmel, 1789 - 1795
- Blas of St. Michael, 1795 - 1801
- Isidoro of St. Vincent, 1801 - 1807
- Juan of the Nativity, 1807 - 1808
- José of St. Rafael, 1808 - 1818 (Vicar General)
- Jerónimo of St. Felix, 1818 - 1824
- Luis of the Assumption, 1824 - 1827 (Vicar General)
- Ignacio of St. Joseph, 1827 - 1830 (Vicar General)
- Antonio of Bl. Michael of the Saints, 1830 - 1840
- Juan of the Visitation, 1841 - 1850 (Apostolic Commissary)
- José of the Trinity, 1851 - 1860 (Apostolic Commissary)
- Jorge of the Virgin, 1860 - 1879 (Apostolic Commissary)
- Bernardino of Bl. Sacrament, 1879 - 1895 (Apostolic Commissary)
- Esteban of the Imm. Heart of Mary, 1895 - 1897 (Apostolic Commissary); 1897 - 1900 (Minister General)
- Gregorio of Jesus and Mary, 1900 - 1906
- Antonino of the Assumption, 1906 - 1919 and 1931 - 1943
- Xavier of the Immaculate Conception, 1919 - 1931
- Ignazio of the Bl. Sacrament, 1943 - 1947 and 1947 - 1959
- Michele of Jesus, 1959 - 1971
- Ignacio Vizcargüénaga Arriortua, 1971 - 1977 and 1977 - 1983

== Ministers General after 1983 ==
- José Gamarra Mayor, 1983 - 1989 and 1989 - 1995
- José Hernández Sánchez, 1995 - 2001 and 2001 - 2007
- Jose Narlaly, 2007 - 2013 and 2013 -

== Sources ==
- Antonino de la Asunción (1936). Ministrorum Generalium Ordinis SS. Trinitatis. Roma.
- D'Errico, Anthony (1998). The Trinitarians. An Overview of their eight hundred year service to God and humanity. Roma.
