= Antoine Vérard =

French publisher, bookmaker and bookseller

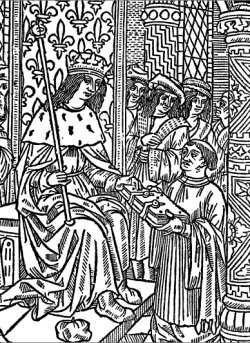
Verard offering an example of one of his books to King Charles VIII of France

Antoine Vérard (active 1485–1512) was a late 15th-century and early 16th-century French publisher, bookmaker and bookseller.

== Life ==
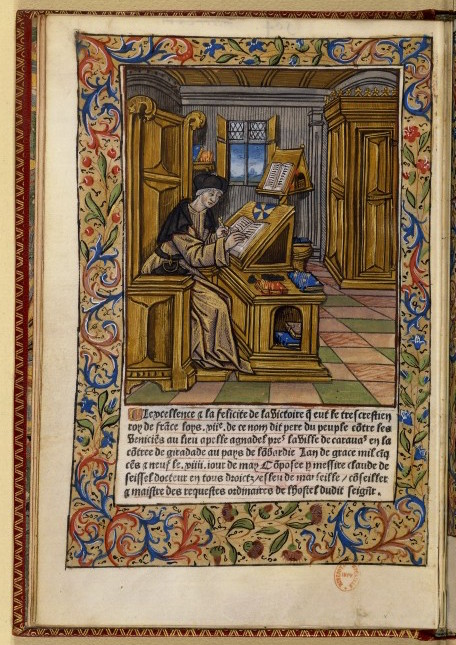
Claude de Seyssel, La Victoire du Roy contre les Véniciens, illuminated manuscript by Antoine Vérard (Bibliothèque nationale de France)

The colophon of a 1485 edition of the Catholicon abbreviatum, the first French-Latin dictionary, which dates to 1485, indicates that Antoine Vérard was based at the heart of the bookselling and printing quarter of Paris, in a shop under the sign of St John the Evangelist, on the Pont Notre-Dame (a bridge built by Charles VI of France, which collapsed in 1499).

This present vocabulary was completed the .iiii. day of February 1485 for anthoine verard bookseller at the image of St John the Evangelist on the pont nostre dame or at the palace before the chapel where they sing the mass of "messeigneurs les presidens".

Vérard was the turning point between illuminated manuscripts and the modern printed edition. He combined the two techniques by printing works illustrated with woodcuts, cheaper, of which he then produced versions on vellum with hand-made illuminations for wealthy clients. He also produced printed works that almost resembled precious hand-produced manuscripts. Many printers worked for him, on vellum and paper. Ornaments and woodcut-plates were rented out and reused by different publishers. Vérard's printer's mark is recognisable for its two eagles on a starred base, supporting a red heart bearing the three letters AVR.

Vérard worked for a leisured bourgeois and noble public, notably king Charles VIII of France and even Henry VII of England. He did not hesitate to offer luscious examples of his work to the king of France, such as a Légende dorée, by Jacobus de Voragine, published in 1493 and offered to Charles VIII and his wife Anne de Bretagne. He did not hesitate to pirate his fellow printers works he saw good work that could sell. He thus took into his business one of the era's great publishing successes, the Calendriers des bergers, originally published by Guy Marchant.

His catalogue was highly varied and included more than 100 different works. He published many books of hours and didactic works, such as Le Jeu des échecs moralisés by the Dominican Jacobus de Cessolis (a post-incunable of 1504), but also poems (François Villon), dramatic works and chivalric romances. He published an edition of the Roman de la rose around 1505, along with one of the Cent nouvelles nouvelles.

With a modern spirit of enterprise, around 1503 Vérard set out to conquer the English bookselling market with an English translation of the Calendrier des bergers (The Kalendar of Shyppars) and of L'Art de bien vivre et de bien mourir (1493), (the Art of Good Lywyng) and of the Chasteau de Labour (Castle of Labour), a 1499 poem by Pierre Gringore. He also published many books of hours for use with the Sarum Rite for the English market. He stopped publishing in about 1512 but his date of death is unknown.

== Selected works published by Vérard ==
- 1486 : Les Cent Nouvelles nouvelles, Bibliothèque Nationale de France, (Rés. Y².174, fol. Q 1v);
- 1488 : Le Livre des trois vertus, Christine de Pisan, Antoine Vérard in 1488;
- 1488 : Chevalier délibéré Olivier de la Marche;
- 1488 : Aristote, Ethiques, Politiques and Yconomique, texts translated into French by Nicole Oresme;
- 1490 : Les apologues et fables de Laurens Valle, tra[n]slatees de latin en francois. [Paris, Antoine Vérard, ca. 1490]. [36] leaves. woodcuts: illus. 28.5 cm. (fol.) From the Rare Book and Special Collections Division at the Library of Congress;
- 1491 : Mystère de la vengeance The first printed edition was published by Antoine Vérard (Bibliothèque Nationale, Paris, Réserve Yf 72. in 1491; it consisted of 22000 verses, divided into three days. It was called an "édition revue et augmentée" of the Mystère de Mercadé;
- 1493 : Les Grandes Chroniques de France, on vellum for subsequent illumination
- 1493 : Lart de bien viure et de bien mourir, etcetera. Paris [Antoine Vérard] for André Bocard, 12 Feb. 1453 [i.e. 1493/94]. From the Rare Book and Special Collections Division at the Library of Congress
- 1496 : La Légende dorée; Jacobus de Voragine
- 1498 : De la généalogie des dieux [98] BN J 845;
- 1498 : Les regnars traversants les périlleuses voyes des folles fiances du monde, tableau en prose et en vers des abus et des fourberies dont les hommes se rendent coupables. Exhortacion où par les premières lettres des lignes, trouverez le nom de lacteur de ce présent livre et le lieu de sa nativité. Iehan Boucher Natif de Poictiers [117], Paris, Antoine Vérard, Masson in 4° 626, Catalogue BM;
- 1485 : Catholicon abbreviatum, the first French-Latin dictionary;
  Ce present vocabulaire fut acheve le .iiii. jour de fevrier Mil quatrecens quatrevingtz et cinq pour anthoine verard libraire demourant a l'ymaige saint jehan l'evangeliste. sur le pont nostre dame. ou au palais devant la chapelle ou l'en chante la messe de messeigneurs les presidens.
- 1492 : Lamentations de Matheolus (republication of a very popular misogynist work, notably cited in Le Livre des trois vertus by Christine de Pisan;
- 1498 : (?) Bible historiale complétée ( text by Pierre Comestor and Guiart );
- 1500 : Les regnars... Exhortacion où par les premières lettres des lignes, trouverez le nom de lacteur de ce present livre et le lieu de sa nativité, par « Iehan Boucher Natif de Poictiers », BN Rés Yh 7, BM;
- 1502 Le Jardin de plaisance et fleur de rhétorique;

== Bibliography ==
- Renouard, Philippe (1965) Répertoire des imprimeurs parisiens, libraires, fondeurs de caractères, et correcteurs d'imprimerie depuis l'introduction de l'imprimerie à Paris (1470) jusqu'à la fin du seizième siècle. Paris: Minard
- Winn, Mary Beth (1997) Antoine Verard, Parisian Publisher, 1485-1512. Genève: Droz
