= Hôtel de Ville, Beauvais =

Town hall in Beauvais, France

Hôtel de Ville
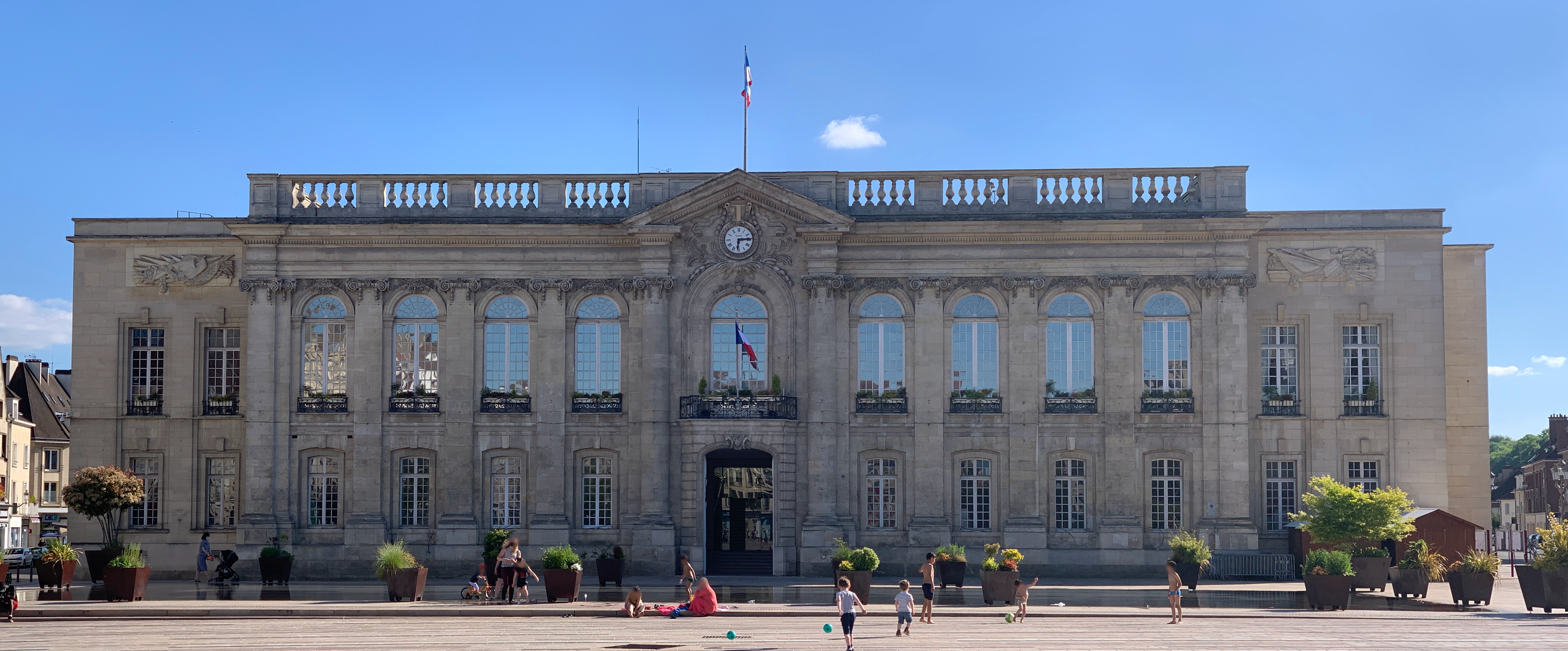
- The main frontage of the Hôtel de Ville in May 2021

General information
- Type: City hall
- Architectural style: Neoclassical style
- Location: Beauvais, France
- Coordinates: 49.4296°N 2.0819°E
- Completed: 1757

Design and construction
- Architect: Suier Bayeux

Monument historique
- Official name: Hôtel de ville
- Type: Inscrit
- Designated: 1912
- Reference no.: PA00114509

The Hôtel de Ville (French pronunciation: [otɛl də vil], City Hall) is a municipal building in Beauvais, Oise, northern France, standing on Place Jean-Hachette. It was designated a monument historique by the French government in 1912.

== History ==
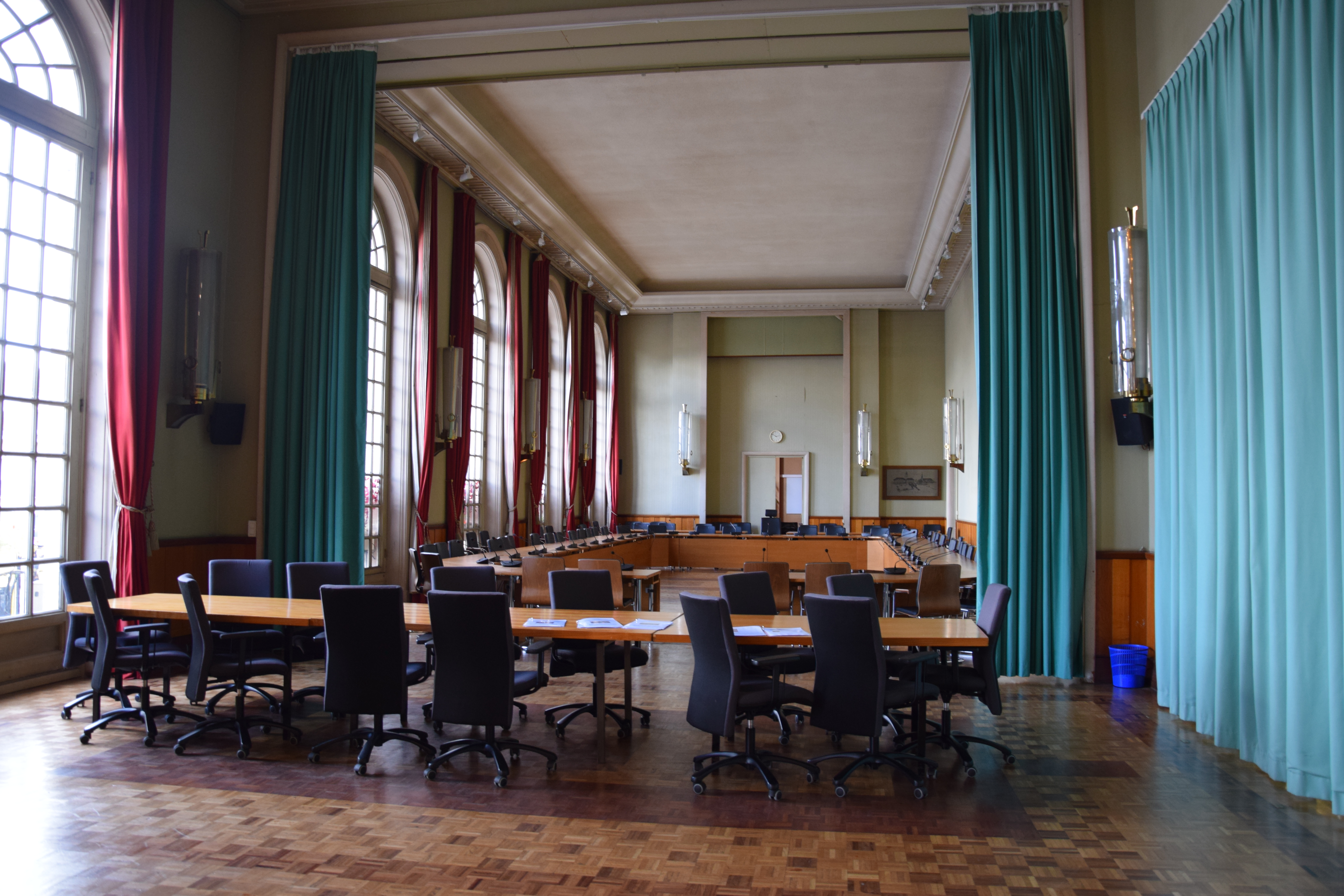
The Salle du Conseil (council chamber)

The first town hall in Beauvais was the Maison de la Voûte on the southwest side of the Grand-Place (now Place Jean-Hachette). In 1480, the aldermen relocated to an adjacent building, the Hôtel de Écu de Flandre. Although it was rebuilt several times, by the mid-18th century, the building was dilapidated and so the town council decided to demolish it and to erect a new building in its place. The foundation stone for the new building was laid by Bishop Étienne-René Potier de Gesvres on 30 April 1753. It was designed by Suier Bayeux in the neoclassical style, built in ashlar stone and was completed in 1757.

The design involved a symmetrical main frontage of nine bays facing onto the Grand-Place. The central bay featured a segmental headed doorway with a moulded surround and a keystone on the ground floor and a French door with a balcony on the first floor. The central bay was flanked by a pair of full-height Ionic order columns supporting an open pediment with a clock in the tympanum. The other bays were fenestrated by segmental headed windows on the ground floor and by round headed windows on the first floor. The bays were flanked by Ionic order pilasters supporting an entablature, a modillioned cornice and a balustraded parapet. Fine carvings on the facade were created by Claude Maurice Rapin and Pierre Joseph Jannelle. Internally, the principal room was the Salle du Conseil (council chamber).

A statue by the sculptor, Gabriel Vital-Dubray, depicting Jeanne Hachette, who led the defence of the town when it was besieged by Charles the Bold in the 15th century, was unveiled in front of the town hall in the presence of the President of France, Louis Napoleon Bonaparte, on 6 July 1851. During the ceremony, the poet, Fanny Dénoix des Vergnes, read a poem, Jeanne Hachette, or the siege of Beauvais.

In March 1918, during the later stages of the First World War, Marshal Ferdinand Foch, established his headquarters in the town hall. His appointment as Supreme Allied Commander was confirmed, on 3 April 1918, at a conference in the town hall in the presence of the French Prime Minister, Georges Clemenceau, the Commander-in-Chief of the French Army, Marshal Philippe Pétain, the British Prime Minister, David Lloyd George, the Commander-in-Chief of the British Expeditionary Force, Field Marshal Sir Douglas Haig, the Chief of the Imperial General Staff, Lieutenant General Sir Henry Wilson, the Chief of Staff of the United States Army, General Tasker H. Bliss, and the Commander of the American Expeditionary Forces, General John J. Pershing.

The building was badly damaged by German bombing during the Battle of France in June 1940, part of the Second World War. The façade was saved but the building itself was gutted. The restoration of the structure behind the façade was carried out a design by a local architect, Georges Noël, and was completed in November 1957. The restoration led to the creation of two side wings which were slightly set back from the main structure and were fenestrated with square headed windows and surmounted by a parapet. Above the first-floor windows, on the side wings, bas reliefs were installed: the one on the left, sculpted by Maurice Debus depicted "La Renaissance de Beauvais" ("the rebirth of Beauvais") and the one on the right, sculpted by Claude Bouscau, depicted "Beauvais devant l'adversité" ("Beauvais in the face of adversity"). New furniture for the building was made by the furniture designer, Jules Leleu.
