= Beauvais Conference =

The Beauvais Conference of World War I was held at the request of French Prime Minister Georges Clemenceau to solidify command of the Western Front and to ensure the maximum participation of France's allies in the war. The conference was held on April 3, 1918, at the Hôtel de Ville (town hall) in Beauvais, France, one week after the Doullens Conference that appointed General Ferdinand Foch as Commander of the Western Front. Clemenceau thought the wording of the Doullens Agreement was too weak, and that a correction was needed to solidify Foch's command. The urgency of the meeting was underpinned by Germany's Spring Offensive on the Western Front, which opened a gap 50 miles (80 km) wide and 50 miles (80 km) deep in the line, forcing the British Expeditionary Force to reel back, and retreat orders from both French and British army commanders to protect their armies.

== Background ==
Immediately after the Doullens Conference, Prime Minister Clemenceau came under pressure to strengthen the Doullens note's wording, which read:

"General Foch is charged by the British and French Governments to co-ordinate the action of the Allied Armies on the Western Front. He will work to this end with the Commanders-in-Chief who are asked to furnish him with all necessary information."

On the return trip from the Doullens Conference to Paris, Clemenceau's military aide General Henri Mordacq thought the note looked weak. Mordacq wrote, "He discussed the matter with me thoroughly (and said) everything depends on..the three men leading the armies..if they cooperate with each other, everything will go along well." Those three men were General's Petain, Haig, and the new arrival from the United States, General "Black Jack" Pershing. Mordacq was convinced General Petain would remain loyal to General Foch, but he had serious concerns about General Douglas Haig, who married into royalty (Haig married the maid of honour at Queen Alexandra's wedding, he supplied copies of his wartime diary to the King because the King was bored, and he always had an open door to the King), and who might ignore the Doullens directive at will. Legally, the words in the note, "to conduct the action of the Allied Armies" meant to lead during times of conflict, but not to lead during breaks in the conflict. General Mordacq said, "Since the situation (the wording on the Doullens Agreement) is not clear, and since the word 'coordination' does not mean 'command', Marshal Haig is unfortunately compelled to debate his orders." This could lead to another catastrophe. Convinced this was now a serious concern, Clemenceau flip-flopped on the Doullens note (wanting easy words at the Doullens Conference to appease General's Petain and Haig over Foch's promotion, and now wanting hard words to secure Foch's position).

== The Role of Winston Churchill ==
David Lloyd George and Winston Churchill were close political allies after Churchill turned from the Conservative Party to the Liberal Party in 1905. In 1917, despite the Gallipoli disaster and opposition from conservatives on the War Cabinet, the Prime Minister revived Winston's career by making him Minister of Munitions. Winston was also allowed to sit in at all War Cabinet meetings. After Lord Milner returned from the Doullens Conference and reported to the War Cabinet, the Prime Minister asked Churchill, on March 28, to go to France as his personal liaison to General Foch. Both Lord Milner and General Henry Wilson (CIGS) opposed this, thinking Churchill's meddling could pose a problem. As the War Cabinet's de facto emissary to France, Lord Milner was most upset. After protesting, the conservatives received assurance that Winston would avoid the front and only talk to officials in Paris. Henry Wilson and Leo Amery personally delivered the message. However, Prime Minister Clemenceau disregarded it and took Winston on tours of the front to meet each of France's important generals. The two discovered that General Foch was doing an outstanding job as Commander of the Western Front. Prime Minister Clemenceau also asked Winston to help draft a letter to President Woodrow Wilson to request 120,000 US infantry troops for each of the next four months. He did this, and the request was approved by President Wilson on April 1. Later, when Prime Minister Clemenceau was convinced that General Foch's powers should be strengthened further, Mordacq explained why to Churchill, who "listened to me with close attention, but did not reply to my suggestions. We soon changed the subject". However, this did not absolve Churchill from meddling in other affairs. He played an important role for the French in orchestrating the Beauvais Conference, when at midnight on April 1, he sent the following fictitious telegram to Lloyd George:

"Clemenceau wants you, if you can, to come here at once. Considerable difficulties about the high command which you will readily understand have arisen. There has been a serious misunderstanding between the three commanders, Foch, Haig, Rawlinson about the responsibility for the front at the junction of the armies...To-day Clemenceau has personally adjusted some of the difficulties, but he now asks me to remind you of your promise to come and appeals to you to do so."

== The Beauvais Conference ==
Based on Winston's letter, Lloyd George and Henry Wilson made plans to leave for France at once. On April 3, they were greeted in Boulogne (France) by Churchill, and they travelled most of the way together to GHQ (Montreuil). Outside of town, Henry Wilson insisted that Winston play no part in military discussions, and he was asked to get out of the car. In town, the party picked up General Haig and continued on to Beauvais for the important conference (Churchill was picked up in Boulogne, that evening, on the way home). The Beauvais Conference lasted a full hour and a half (from 3:00pm to 4:30pm), with the English rejecting all French proposals to strengthen Foch's hand. When the French suggested using the words "supreme command" in the new text for Foch's command, Lloyd George said, "If the War Office and he himself were to consent to it, the English parliament would certainly not approve such a decision at the present moment." However, in the end, the parties did agree to alter some of the Doullens Agreement. A deal was reached when Prime Minister Clemenceau reached into his vest and pulled out a paper (General Mordacq wrote the words in the car on the way to the meeting), and General's Pershing and Bliss together said 'This will be the true solution and we shall accept it.' The French generals often complained that the English generals were good on tactics (the small picture) but short on strategy (the big picture, due to a century of peace in England and their 100,000 strong firefighting army made to deal with problems in its colonies). After looking over the new wording, and each other, General Wilson said, "One never knew with precision where strategy began and where it left off". General Foch answered, "that it was known with precision in France, and that nothing better was asked than an opportunity to explain it to our English comrades". The English accepted the words at this special gathering. The new text at Beauvais read:

"General Foch is charged by the British, French and American governments with the task of coordinating the action of the Allied armies on the western front. They are conferred upon him, for this purpose, all necessary powers to make the realization of his undertaking effective. For this reason, the British, French and American governments entrust to General Foch the strategic direction of military operations. The commanders-in-chief of the British, French and American armies retain, in the fullest sense, the tactical control of their forces. Each commander-in-chief will have the right to appeal to his government, if in his judgment, his army is endangered by any order received from General Foch."

== General Foch Still Needs a Title ==
Yet another problem with General Foch's promotion was solved on April 15. General Foch wrote the following letter to Prime Minister Clemenceau:

"The Beauvais Conference on April 3rd gave me sufficient powers to lead the Allied War. (However), they are not known to subordinates, due to indecisions, (and) delays in execution. To remedy this, by my letter of April 5th, I had the honor to ask you to be so kind as to let me know the title I should take in my new duties. I propose that of, 'Commander-in-Chief of the Allied Armies'. As there are no delays in the conduct of operations, please send my request urgently to the English government so that it can respond without delay.” General Foch’s request for a title was immediately approved by both the English and French governments.

However, Prime Minister Clemenceau said the word, "Commander" in the title was a problem for the English (General Haig's title was, "Commander in Chief, British Expeditionary Forces"), and it was therefore always translated by the English as "General in Chief".

=== Lloyd George's opposition to a unified command ===
On the matter of a unified command, on November 17, 1917, Prime Minister Lloyd George went before The House of Commons and said he was "utterly opposed to that suggestion", due to historical differences between the two countries. Further, Lloyd George opposed it at the third Supreme War Council meeting held in Versailles on 1-2 February 1918, by saying, "From the point of view of home politics..never..would he be able to suggest such a proposition, either to Parliament or to the public." Also, at the fourth War Council meeting, held in London in the middle of March, he said the appointment of General Foch, a Frenchman, to head up the Allied General Reserve (which still only existed on paper) was "a great concession" to the French, and due to the actual political situation in England (historical animosity with France), "he could not go any further in that direction". Lord Milner, using his plenipotentiary powers, fortunately corrected all that at the Doullens Conference.
