= Beauvais–Tillé Airport =

International airport serving Beauvais, France

Beauvais–Tillé Airport Aéroport de Beauvais-Tillé Advanced Landing Ground (ALG) A-61/B-42
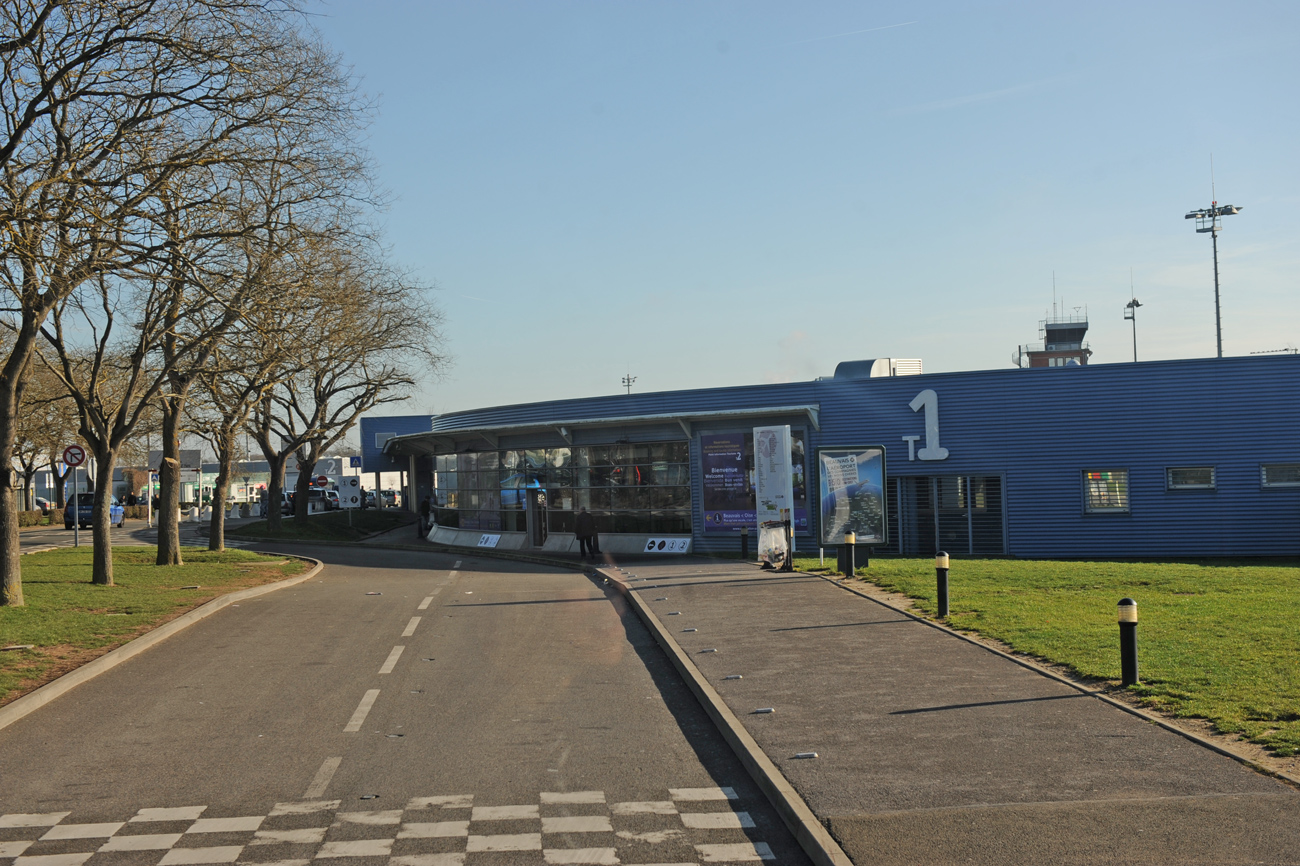
- IATA: BVA; ICAO: LFOB

Summary
- Airport type: Public
- Operator: Chambre de Commerce et d'Industrie (CCI) de l'Oise
- Serves: Beauvais / Paris
- Location: Tillé
- Focus city for: Ryanair
- Elevation AMSL: 359 ft (109 m)
- Coordinates: 49°27′16″N 02°06′46″E
- Website: www.aeroportparisbeauvais.com/en/

Map
- Location of airport in Picardy region LFOB (France)

Runways
Direction	Length		Surface
Direction	m	ft	Surface
12/30	2,430	7,972	Asphalt
04/22	708	2,323	Asphalt

Statistics (2022)
- Passengers: 4,614,424
- Passenger traffic change: ▲122.5%
- Sources: French AIP, Aeroport.fr

Beauvais–Tillé Airport (French: Aéroport de Beauvais-Tillé [bovɛ tije]) (IATA: BVA, ICAO: LFOB), branded as Paris–Beauvais Airport, is an international airport near the city of Beauvais in the commune of Tillé in France. In 2016, it was the tenth busiest airport in France, handling 3,997,856 passengers, and is mostly used by charter and low-cost airlines.

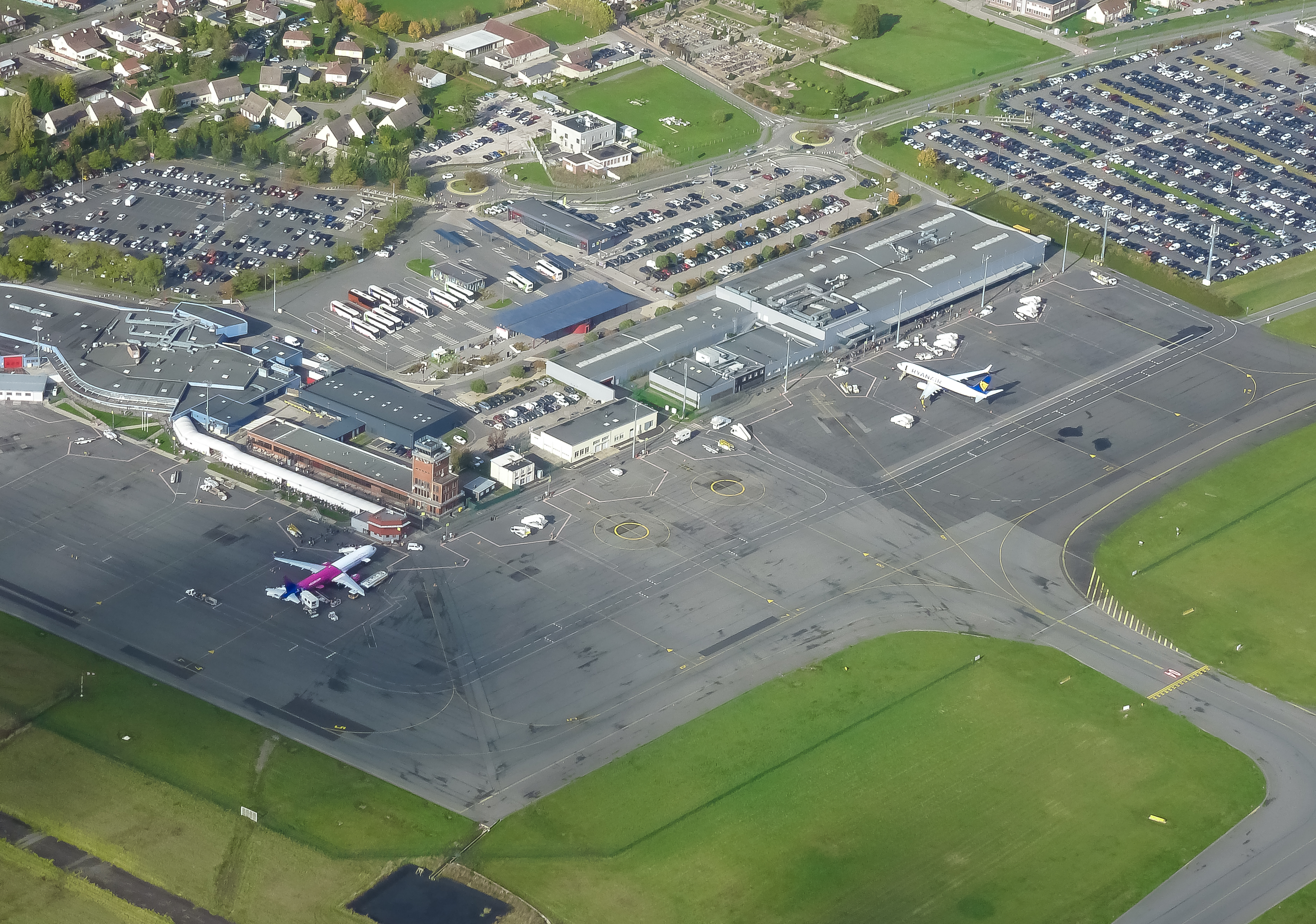
Aerial view of Beauvais-Tillé Airport Terminal

Despite its brand name, the airport is located in the Hauts-de-France region and 69 km (43 mi) north-northwest of Paris.

== History ==
=== German use during World War II ===
This airport was built in the 1930s and seized by the Germans in June 1940 during the Battle of France. Beauvais was used as a Luftwaffe military airfield during the occupation. Known units assigned (all from Luftflotte 3, Fliegerkorps IV):

- Kampfgeschwader 76 (KG 76) June – 24 October 1940 Dornier Do 17Z-2 (Fuselage Code: F1+)
- Sturzkampfgeschwader 1 (SKG 1) July 1940 Junkers Ju 87B Stuka

The initial German use of the airport was as a bomber base. kg 76 and SKG 1 both took part in the Battle of Britain. kg 76 was reduced to 19 out of 29 serviceable machines by 18 August 1940. kg 76 raided London on 7 and 15 September 1940.

- Kampfgeschwader 26 (KG 26) September 1940 – February 1941 Heinkel He 111H (Fuselage Code: 1H+)
- Kampfgeschwader 77 (KG 77) 3–22 March 1941 Junkers Ju 88A-1 (Fuselage Code: 3A+)
- Kampfgeschwader 4 (KG 4) 30 June – 19 July 1941 Heinkel He 111H (Fuselage Code: 5J+)
- Kampfgeschwader 54 (KG 54) 9 July – 16 August 1942 Junkers Ju 88A-1 (Fuselage Code: B3+)
- Kampfgeschwader 6 (KG 6) December 1942 – February 1943 Junkers Ju 88A-1 (Fuselage Code: K6+)

With the Luftwaffe switching to night attacks on England, the badly damaged units at Beauvais were replaced by a series of He 111 and Ju 88A units that carried out anti-shipping missions (KG 26, KG 77) and night bombing missions over England (KG 4, KG 54, KG 6).

- Jagdgeschwader 26 (JG 26) 15 August – 3 October 1943 Focke-Wulf Fw 190A
- Jagdgeschwader 1 (JG 1) 6–30 June 1944 Messerschmitt Bf 109G

The increasing number and frequency of USAAF Eighth Air Force Boeing B-17 Flying Fortress and Consolidated B-24 Liberator daylight heavy bomber raids over occupied Europe and Germany made the Luftwaffe move out the bomber units and assign day interceptor fighter units to attack the American bombers as part of the Defense of the Reich. After the invasion of Normandy, elements of JG 1 were moved to France and were tasked with providing air support to the German army, along with their normal air defense role against Allied bombers.

In response to the interceptor attacks, Beauvais was attacked by USAAF Ninth Air Force Martin B-26 Marauder medium bombers and Republic P-47 Thunderbolt fighter-bombers with 500-pound general-purpose bombs, unguided rockets and .50 caliber machine gun sweeps when Eighth Air Force heavy bombers were within interception range of the Luftwaffe aircraft assigned to the base. The attacks were timed to have the maximum effect possible to keep the interceptors pinned down on the ground and be unable to attack the heavy bombers. Also the North American P-51 Mustang fighter-escort groups of Eighth Air Force would drop down on their return to England and attack the base with a fighter sweep.

=== American use ===
It was liberated by Allied ground forces about 3 September 1944 during the Northern France Campaign. Almost immediately, the United States Army Air Forces IX Engineer Command 818th Engineer Aviation Battalion cleared the airport of mines and destroyed Luftwaffe aircraft. Little battle damage was sustained, and the airport became a USAAF Ninth Air Force combat airfield, designated as Advanced Landing Ground "A-61" about 15 September, also being known as "Beauvais/Tille Airfield".

From Beauvais, the Ninth Air Force 322d Bombardment Group flew B-26 Marauder medium bombers from mid-September until March 1945. Once the combat unit moved east, the airport was used by transport units, flying in supplies from England and evacuating combat casualties on the return trip. The Americans returned full control of the airport to French authorities on 17 August 1945.

=== Development since the 1950s ===
In 1950, the Air Ministry offered to provide the wartime air base to NATO as part of the Cold War development of the alliance.

Demolition crews arrived and removed the wartime wreckage, and any unexploded munitions were removed from the site. Funding shortages did not allow the construction of an 8,000 feet (2,400 m) jet runway, dispersal pads and other features found at a modern military airfield. Instead, in 1953, the NATO plans for Beauvais were discontinued and the airport was returned to private hands.

== Facilities ==
=== Control tower ===
The new control tower has been active since 22 January 2019. It is located on the southern side of the airport and replaced the tower from 1962, which sat between the two terminals.

=== Runway ===
The main runway has an Instrument landing system CAT III for runway 12 and CAT I for runway 30 plus a Precision Approach Path Indicator (PAPI) for both runways. This enables aircraft to land at the airport in bad weather conditions, with visibility as low as 75 metres.

=== Terminal ===
When the low-cost airline Ryanair chose Beauvais–Tillé in May 1997 for three daily connections with Dublin, the terminal of this regional airport consisted of a simple hangar built in 1979. Since then four additional stations for planes and in 2010 a second terminal of 6,000 square metres (65,000 sq ft) had to be built to face a significant increase in traffic. The airport is equipped to handle medium-sized passenger jets. Since 2007 the ban on night flying has been strictly enforced for the benefit of local residents. The terminal building closes between the hours of 23:30 and 06:30. The airport has two terminals, some restaurants, snack bars, and shopping areas, both airside and in the publicly accessible area. An Ibis Budget hotel, which provides 78 rooms, has been built next to Terminal 2.

== Airlines and destinations ==
The following airlines operate regular scheduled and charter flights at Beauvais–Tillé Airport:

Airlines	Destinations
Dan Air	Seasonal: Bacău
HiSky	Baia Mare, Chișinău
Ryanair	Agadir, Alicante, Barcelona, Bari, Birmingham, Bologna, Brindisi, Budapest, Bucharest–Otopeni, Cagliari, Catania, Cluj-Napoca, Cork, Dublin, Edinburgh, Essaouira, Faro, Fez, Funchal, Gdańsk, Iași, Kraków, Lisbon, Madrid, Málaga, Malta, Manchester, Marrakesh, Milan Bergamo, Milan–Malpensa, Nador, Oujda, Palermo, Palma de Mallorca, Paphos, Pisa, Porto, Poznań, Prague, Rabat, Reggio Calabria, Rome–Fiumicino, Seville, Sofia, Stockholm–Arlanda, Tangier, Thessaloniki, Tirana, Treviso, Valencia, Vienna, Vilnius, Warsaw–Modlin, Wrocław, Zagreb; Seasonal: Amman–Queen Alia, Belfast–International, Copenhagen, Dubrovnik, Figari, Girona, Ibiza, Lanzarote, Naples, Olbia, Rovaniemi, Sarajevo, Tenerife–South, Turin, Zadar
Volotea	Seasonal: Bastia
Wizz Air	Belgrade, Bucharest–Otopeni, Chișinău, Cluj-Napoca, Craiova, Gdańsk, Iași, Kutaisi, Podgorica, Skopje, Sofia, Târgu Mureș, Timișoara, Tirana, Varna, Yerevan

== Statistics ==
=== Passengers ===
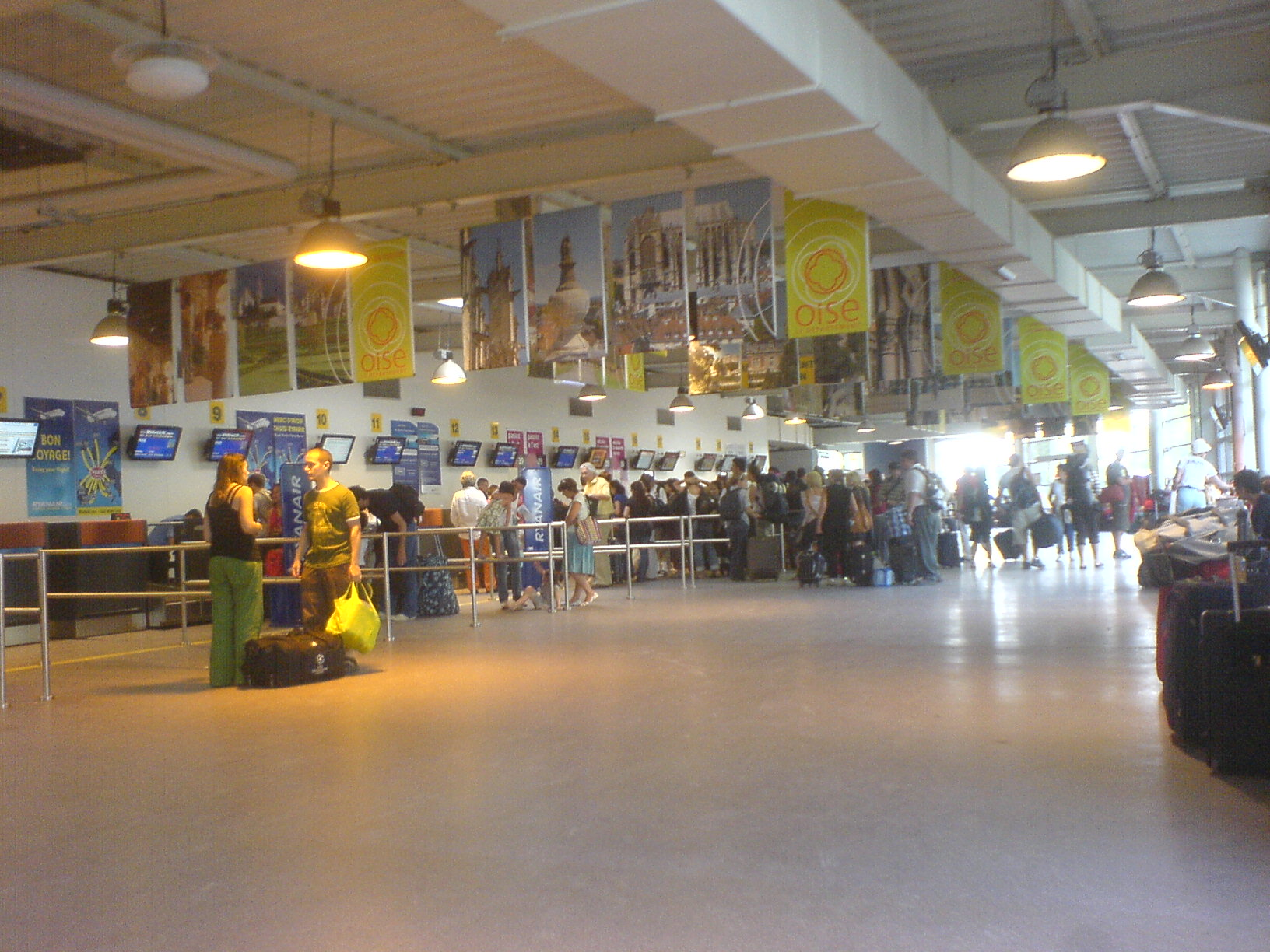
Check-in area

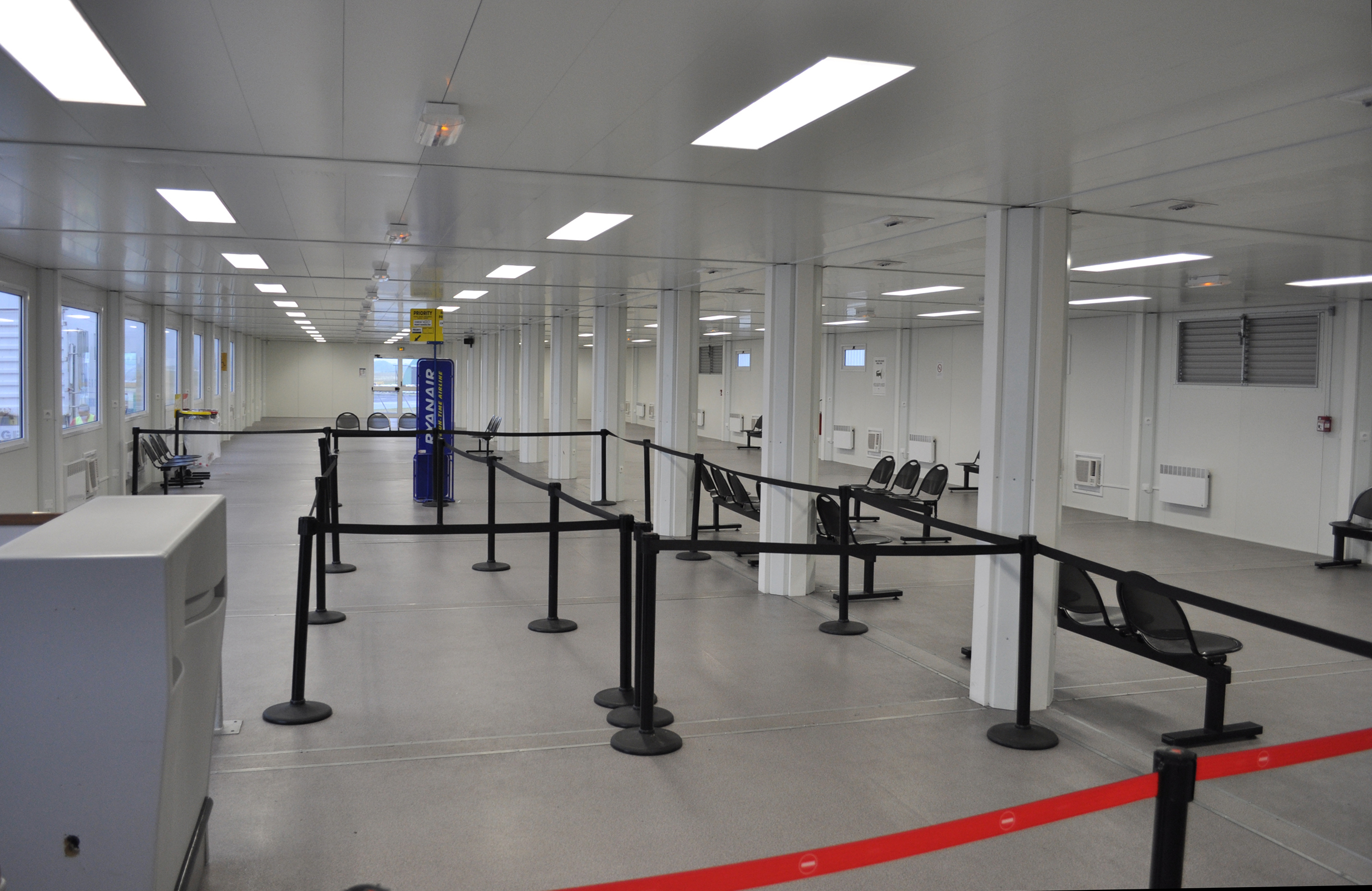
Departure gate area

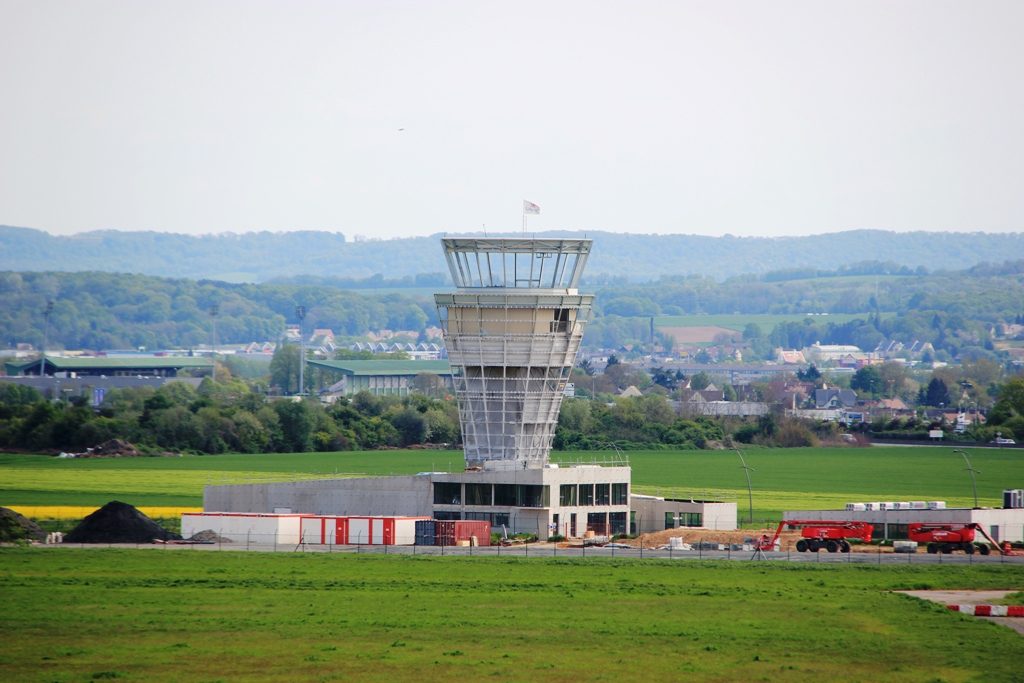
New control tower under construction as of 2016.

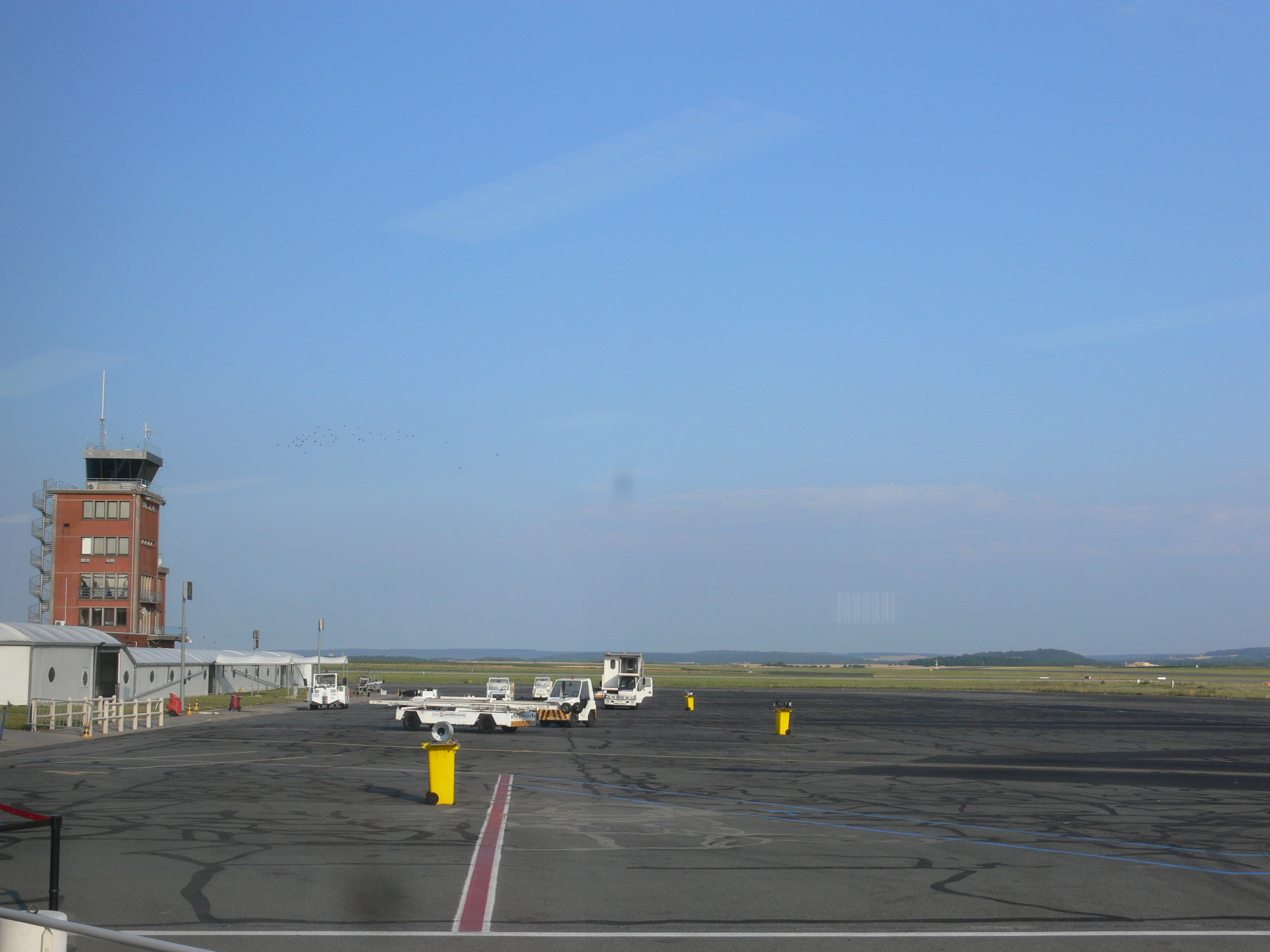
Apron view

Passengers per year
Year	Passengers	Change
1996	64,000	–
1997	209,180	▲226.8%
1998	260,267	▲24.4%
1999	388,836	▲49.4%
2000	387,962	▲29.03%
2001	423,520	▲9.02%
2002	677,857	▲60.02%
2003	969,445	▲43.03%
2004	1,427,595	▲47.26%
2005	1,848,484	▲29.48%
2006	1,887,971	▲2.14%
2007	2,155,633	▲14.18%
2008	2,484,635	▲15.26%
2009	2,591,864	▲4.32%
2010	2,931,796	▲13.12%
2011	3,677,794	▲25.45%
2012	3,862,562	▲5.02%
2013	3,952,908	▲2.34%
2014	4,024,204	▲1.8%
2015	4,330,019	▲7.6%
2016	3,997,678	▼8.8%
2017	3,646,523	▼2%
2018	3,787,086	▲3.8%
2019	3,980,000	▲5.2%
2020	1,258,180	▼64.8%
2021	2,073,643	▲65.4%
2022	4,614,424	▲122.5%

=== Movements ===
Movements per year
Year	Movements	Change
2008	33,724	–
2009	32,777	▼2.08%
2010	36,517	▲11.04%
2011	37,657	▲3.01%
2012	35,999	▼4.04%
2013	37,737	▲4.8%
2014	35,315	▼6.4%
2015	33,625	▼4.8%
2016	34,905	▲3.8%
2017	31,159	▼10.7%
2018	32,400	▲3.9%
2019	33,222	▲2.4%
2020	16,918	▼49.1%
2021	24,182	▲30.0%
2022	28,988	▲19.9%

== Access ==
=== Road transport ===
The airport is linked with Paris city through coach and rail services. Travel time to Paris is 75 minutes by coach which drops off and collects passengers beside the Palais des Congrès at Porte Maillot, located in the 17th arrondissement, approximately a kilometre west of the Arc de Triomphe. There are also minibus and shuttle services that go to Paris.

There is also a taxi rank at the airport.

A commuter bus provided by the Transports Urbains du Beauvaisis runs to Beauvais town centre:

- Line 12: Mairie – Zone d'activités des Tilleuls – Tillé – Aéroport
- Airport Shuttle: Airport – Parc Municipal – Maillart – Cathédrale – Mairie (City Hall) – Gare SNCF (railway station) – Kennedy – Descartes – Délie – Saint-Germain – Elispace – Airport

=== Railway connection ===
Beauvais railway station is situated almost 4 km (2.5 mi) away, with connections to Paris Gare du Nord, Amiens and other destinations.

== See also ==
- Advanced Landing Ground
- List of the busiest airports in France
