= Unilasalle =

French engineering school

UniLaSalle
- Institut Polytechnique UniLaSalle
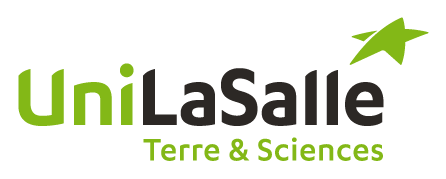
- Motto: Indivisa manent (Latin)
- Motto in English: Forever United
- Type: Private institution
- Established: 1854; 172 years ago
- Affiliations: Roman Catholic
- President: Sébastien Windsor
- Director: Philippe Choquet
- Students: 2,500 (in 2017)
- Location: Beauvais Mont-Saint-Aignan, France
- Campus: Mont-Saint-Aignan
- Language: French
- Mascot: LaSallamandre
- Website: https://international.unilasalle.fr

UniLaSalle is one of the 210 French engineering schools authorized to award engineering degrees. It was created following the merger of ESITPA and LaSalle Beauvais. UniLaSalle is a private higher education establishment offering integrated degree programs (accessible directly after high school). It has two campuses, one in Beauvais and the other in Rouen. It offers three- or five-year degree programs, including engineering degrees in the fields of agriculture, the food industry, food and health, environmental studies and geology. It also offers continuing education and short programs in these fields. It is a non-profit organization created under the 1901 Act. On 7 July 2016 UniLaSalle (under its legal name "Institut Polytechnique UniLaSalle") was officially recognized as an EESPIG (établissement d'enseignement supérieur privé d'intérêt général, or private higher education establishment in the public interest).

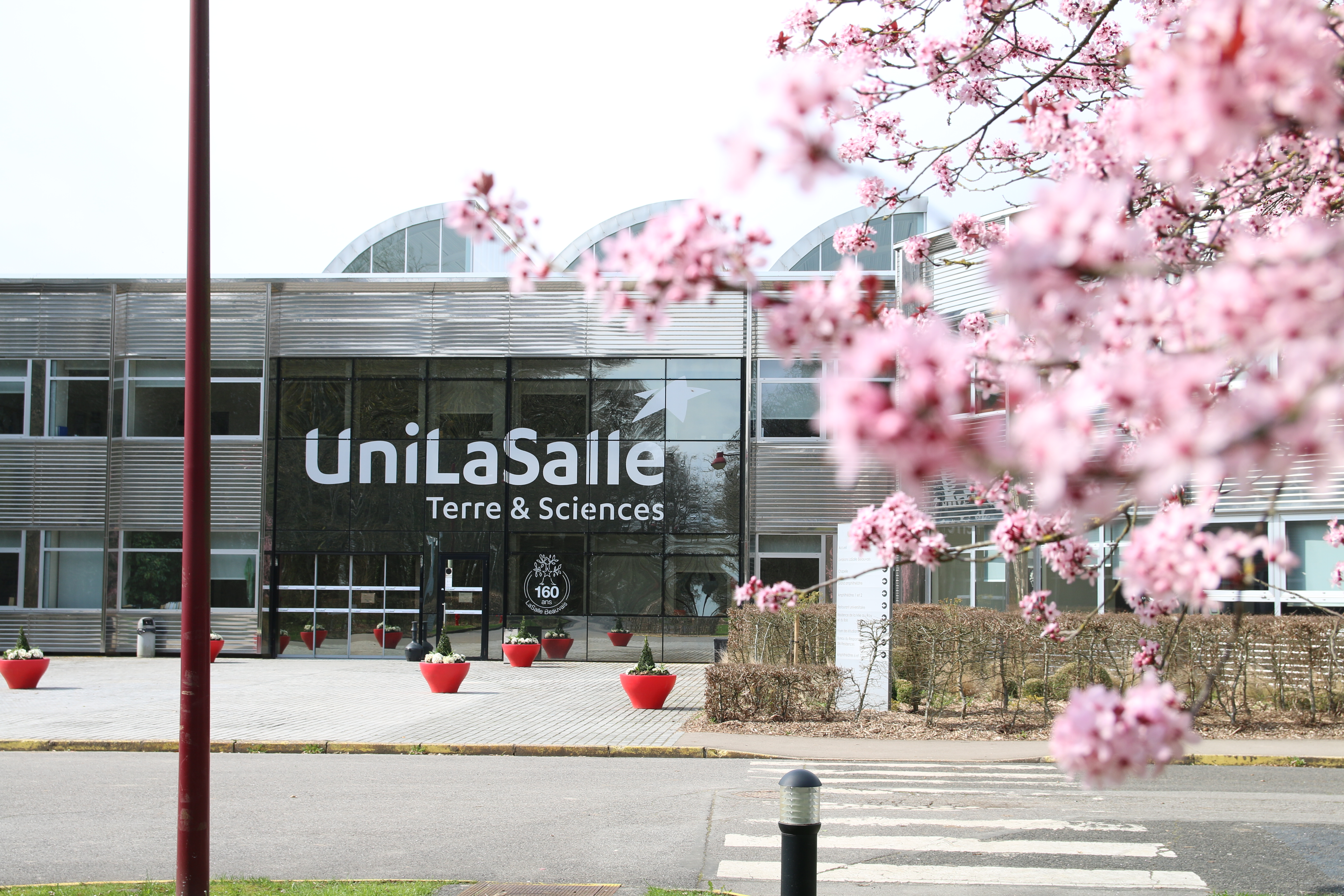
Main academic building of UniLaSalle, at Beauvais campus

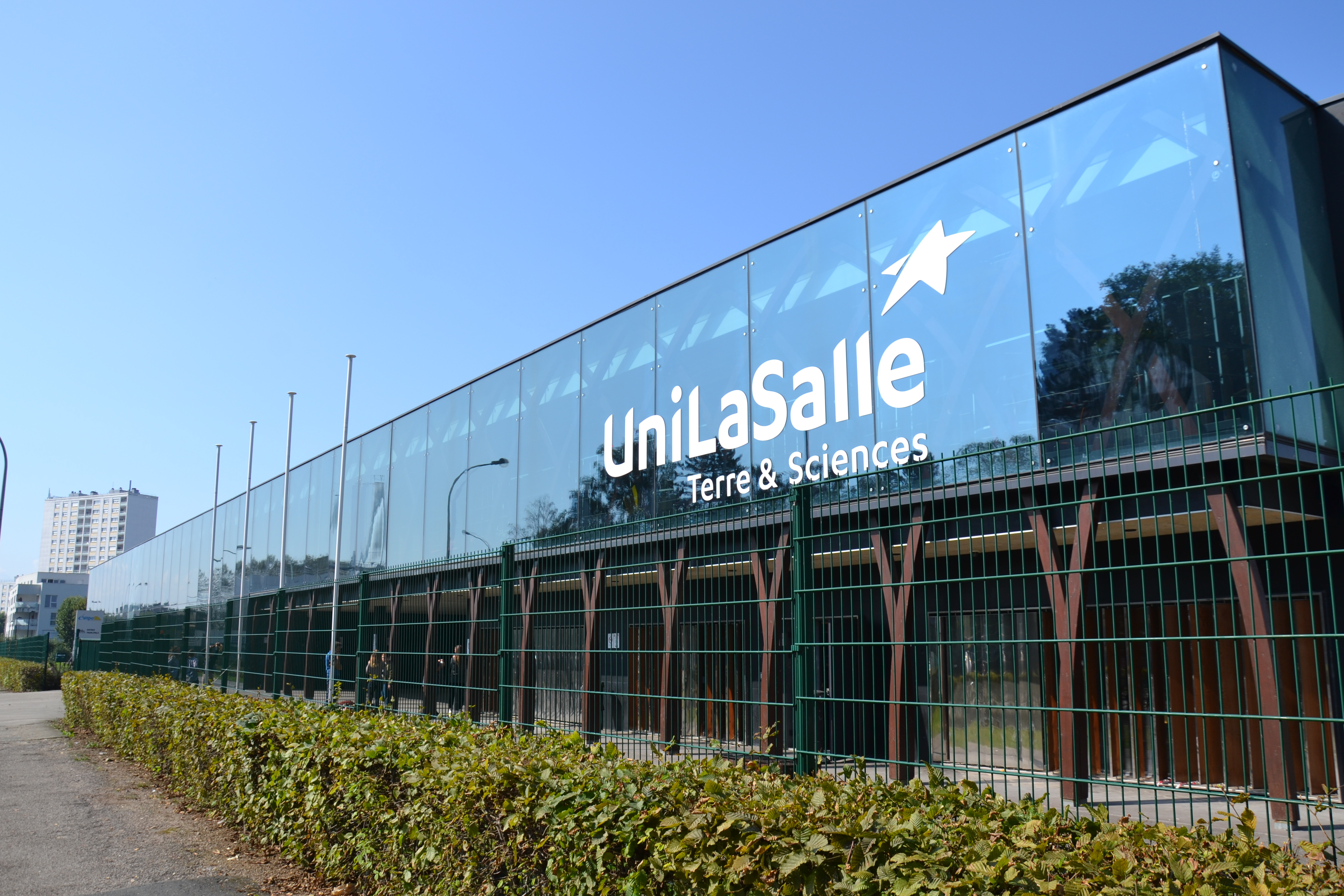
Building of Rouen - Mont-Saint-Aignan campus ofUniLaSalle

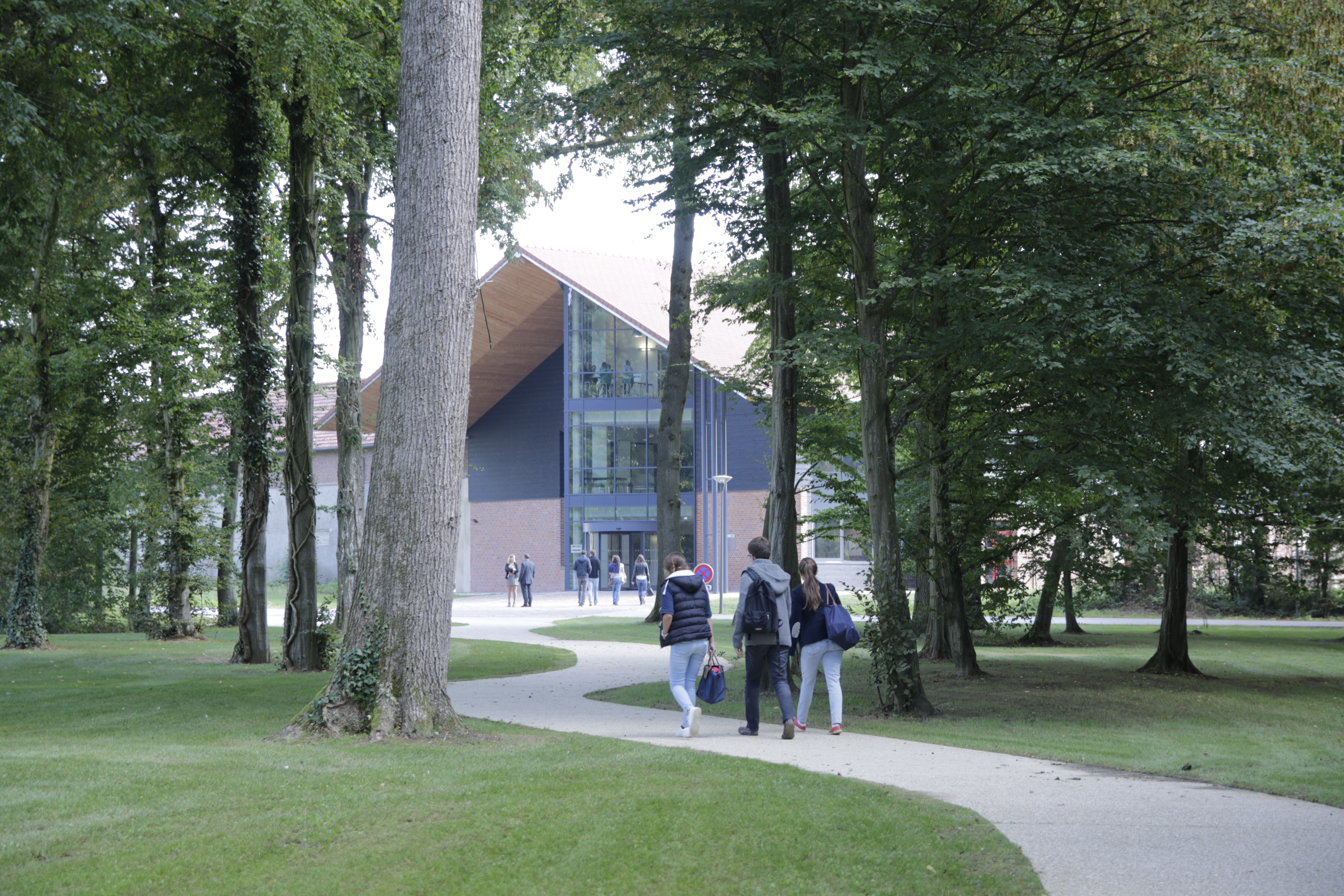
Students walking towards LaFerme, the newest academic building of Beauvais campus

== History ==
=== Institut Supérieur d'Agriculture de Beauvais (ISAB, 1855–2006) ===
The Institut Normal Agricole (which became the Institut Agricole de Beauvais and later the Institut Supérieur d'Agriculture de Beauvais (ISAB)) was founded in 1854 by Brother Ménée, Louis Gossin and Edouard de Tocqueville. The first students arrived the following year.

In 1856, a professor at the Institut Agricole de Beauvais, Eugène Chanoine, developed a variety of potato that he named the Institut de Beauvais.

It was annexed to the Institut Catholique de Paris (ICP) in 1921.

During the two World Wars, it was requisitioned as a military hospital. The building was damaged by a terrible fire in 1939.

In 1964, the ISAB program in agricultural engineering was approved by the Commission des Titres d'Ingénieur (CTI).

The school opened its new campus in 1968, near its experimental farm.

In 1999, ISAB received authorization to award engineering degrees on an apprenticeship basis.

In 2002, a new program in Food & Health Engineering was introduced.

=== IGAL (1959–2006) ===
In 1875, Albert-Auguste de Lapparent became the first holder of the Chair in Geology and Mineralogy at the Université Catholique de Paris (which later became the Institut Catholique de Paris (ICP), founded that same year.

The geology and mineralogy laboratories at ICP were directed by several renowned scientists, including Albert-Auguste de Lapparent, Pierre Teilhard-de-Chardin and Albert-Félix de Lapparent.

In 1959, the Institut Géologique Albert-de-Lapparent (IGAL) was set up within the Faculté libre des Sciences at ICP.

IGAL became independent in 1978, but maintained close relations with ICP.

In 1985, IGAL was officially recognized by the French government. Both of its degree programs (General Studies and Geology) obtained official accreditation in 1994.

In 2001, the school was authorized to award engineering degrees.

=== ESITPA (1919–2015) ===
In 1919, the Institut Technique de Pratique Agricole (ITPA) was set up in Paris (at 38 rue des Écoles in the 5th arrondissement) by Jules-Edouard Lucas. Lucas was 34 when war broke out and he was involved in intensive farming efforts during the war years. In 1915, he founded the Société auxiliaire, directed by Tony Ballu, an agronomic engineer who had graduated from the Institut National Agronomique (INA) in 1903. In 1916, Lucas became director of the Société d'exploitation agricole de la Brenne, whose secretary-general was Henri Bocher (an INA graduate in 1883). Lucas presented a report to the Académie d'Agriculture on the milk supply situation in Paris in 1917, based on data provided by the health department of the Seine Prefecture, railway companies, dairy companies and dairy unions. In 1919, he was appointed director of the Société d'exploitation et de reconstruction agricole, where he had the idea of "creating a teaching establishment after seeing the needs of agriculture, the lack of technicians and the situation of men returning from the battlefield without the opportunity to continue their studies".

It was in 1919, at the Beauregard estate in Mézières-en-Brenne, "during a meeting between Jules-Edouard Lucas, Henri Bocher and André Leroy (INA graduates in 1911), that the idea to set up ITPA emerged, and fellow agronomists were asked to come and join the team". As founder of ITPA, Jules-Edouard Lucas appointed Henri Bocher as director and Tony Ballu – a farmer based in Epernay who used innovative methods involving agricultural machinery – as his deputy, and made the farm in Gournay-sur-Marne available for use by the school. In 1923, Lucas became secretary of the Seine-et-Oise Departmental Agricultural Office, and in 1927 he was elected as a member of the Seine-et-Oise Chamber of Agriculture. He was immediately elected President of the Chamber and sat alongside his peers at the first meeting of the Presidents of Chambers of Agriculture in October 1927, organized by Joseph Faure. At this meeting he remained silent, but at the following session, on 22 March 1928, he spoke at length in favor of an "organized secretariat", "which would be responsible for both documentation and implementation", and which would have sufficient resources to carry out its work effectively. This would become the Assemblée permanente des Chambres d'agriculture (APCA), and the new board of directors elected Lucas as secretary the very same day, on 22 March 1928.

1948: ITPA is officially recognized by the government and begins awarding technical engineering qualifications in agriculture

1964: After receiving official accreditation by the Commission des Titres d'Ingénieur (CTI), the school begins awarding agricultural engineering degrees

1970: ITPA changes its name to ESITPA (Ecole supérieure d'ingénieurs et de techniciens pour l’agriculture)

1976: ESITPA moves to Val-de-Reuil

1981: ESITPA becomes a department of APCA (the Assemblée permanente des Chambres d'agriculture)

1984: Accreditation from the French Ministry of Agriculture as an institution involved in the public service mission of advanced agricultural training

1995: Fourth- and fifth-year students move to Rouen

1998: Development of research activities and creation of four laboratories

2001: A plan is launched to set up a new school on a single site

2004: Adoption of a new educational approach

2007: ESITPA changes its name to "Esitpa, École d'ingénieurs en agriculture"

2008: All the Esitpa entities move together to the Mont-Saint-Aignan university campus in Rouen

2010: Esitpa sets up a new Advanced Master's in Food Marketing, Communication and Engineering

2012: The Professional Bachelor's in Sales Engineering for Animal Nutrition is set up

2013: Engineering apprenticeship programs are introduced. Esitpa changes its status, becoming an administrative public establishment in the Chambers of Agriculture network

In 2013, "ESITPA, Ecole d'ingénieur en agriculture" is created as an inter-institutional organization in the network of Chambers of Agriculture. At this time it has between 110 and 130 students graduating each year

In January 2016, the Institut Polytechnique LaSalle Beauvais merges with ESITPA to form UniLaSalle.

=== Merger of the schools ===
UniLaSalle is the result of the merger between the Institut Supérieur d'Agriculture de Beauvais (ISAB), based in Beauvais, the Institut Géologique Albert-de-Lapparent (IGAL), based in Cergy-Pontoise, and ESITPA in Rouen.

== Ethos ==
Founded by the Brothers of the Christian Schools, UniLaSalle applies the educational principles developed by Jean-Baptiste de La Salle: a sense of responsibility, commitment and service to the wider community, respect for others and acceptance of differences, and an attitude of justice and fairness. It is run under the aegis of the Association La Salle.

The school is also a member of the International Association of LaSalle Universities, which includes just over 80 universities worldwide.

The educational philosophy of UniLaSalle is largely based on observation and practical application. A holistic approach to education is key to this philosophy: teaching and training goes beyond the classroom, with students being encouraged to help organize events on campus.

== Degree programs ==
UniLaSalle offers a range of three- and five-year degrees in the fields of agriculture, the food industry, food and health, environmental studies and geology. It also offers continuing education programs.

=== Bachelor's degrees ===
- Professional Bachelor's in Sales Engineering for Animal Nutrition
- Bachelor's in Geology

=== Engineering degrees ===
The engineering degrees awarded by UniLaSalle are all accredited as Master's degrees by the French Ministry of Higher Education with the approval of the Commission des Titres d'Ingénieur (CTI).

- Engineering degree in Agronomy and Agro-Industry
- Engineering degree in Food and Health (Bioengineering)
- Engineering degree in Earth and Environmental Sciences

=== Master's degrees ===
- Master's in Bioscience, Plant Science, Eco-Production and Bio-Valorization
- Master's in Management of Urban Food Security
- Master's in Plant Breeding (taught in English)

=== Advanced Master's degree ===
- Food Marketing, Communication and Engineering

=== MSc degrees ===
- Agricultural Data Management and Decision Models (taught in English)
- Urban Agriculture and Green Cities (taught in English)

=== Short programs ===
- Spring Semester in Nutritional Sciences (leads to final certificate, taught in English)
- Experiential Learning in Nutritional Sciences (taught in English)
- Geological Field School in France (taught in English)

=== Exchange programs ===
- Programs around the world are offered for a semester with partner schools

== Research ==
In addition to teaching, UniLaSalle also conducts research in three broad areas: agroresources, the interactions between food and health, and geosciences.

It is a member of the "Industries et agroressources" competitiveness cluster and a founding member of the "Céreales vallée" cluster.

== Campus and student life ==
UniLaSalle is set on a 10-hectare campus located near Beauvais in northern France. As well as the main academic building, the campus has other facilities that host a range of activities for students.

Since 2016, UniLaSalle has also had a campus in Mont-Saint-Aignan, near Rouen.

The site UniLaSalle inaugurated in 1992, is located in the heart of the Ker Lann campus in Bruz, Rennes.

Another site of UniLaSalle is the ESIEE - Amiens campus, located on the banks of the Somme, near the city center and the student district of Saint-Leu.
