= Supreme Allied Commander =

Title description for military command

Supreme Allied Commander is the title held by the most senior commander within certain multinational military alliances, most notably by the North Atlantic Treaty Organisation (NATO). It originated as a term used by the Allies during World War I, and is currently used within NATO for Supreme Allied Commander Europe (SACEUR) and Supreme Allied Commander Transformation (SACT).

== Historical titles ==
=== World War I ===
On 26 March 1918, the French marshal Ferdinand Foch was appointed Supreme Allied Commander, gaining command of all Allied forces everywhere, and coordinated the British, French, American, and Italian armies to stop the German spring offensive, the last large offensive of the German Empire. He was the one who accepted the German cessation of hostilities in his private train.

From the left: Supreme Allied Commander Ferdinand Foch, Georges Clemenceau, David Lloyd George, Vittorio Orlando, Sidney Sonnino

On 3 April 1918, Foch was appointed "strategic direction of operations" at the Beauvais Conference. By 14 April 1918, Foch received the title of "Commander in Chief".

=== World War II ===
During World War II, the Allied leaders appointed Supreme Allied Commanders to manage the multi-nation, multi-discipline fighting forces for a particular theater of war. These Supreme Allied Commanders were given operational control over all air, land, and sea units in that theatre. In other cases, senior commanders were given the title Commander-in-Chief.

These Supreme Allied Commanders were drawn from the most senior leaders in the British Armed Forces and United States Armed Forces. These commanders reported to the British/American Combined Chiefs of Staff, although in the case of the Pacific and South East Asia, the relevant national command authorities of the American Joint Chiefs of Staff or the British Chiefs of Staff Committee had responsibility for the main conduct of the war in the theatre, depending on the Supreme Commander's nationality.

General of the Army Dwight D. Eisenhower served in successive Supreme Allied Commander roles. Eisenhower was the Commander-in-Chief, Allied Force for the Mediterranean theatre. Eisenhower then served as Supreme Commander Allied Expeditionary Force (SCAEF) in the European theatre, starting in December 1943 with the creation of the command to execute Operation Overlord and ending in July 1945 shortly after the end of World War II in Europe. In 1950, Eisenhower would again be a Supreme Allied Commander, the first to hold the post for NATO.

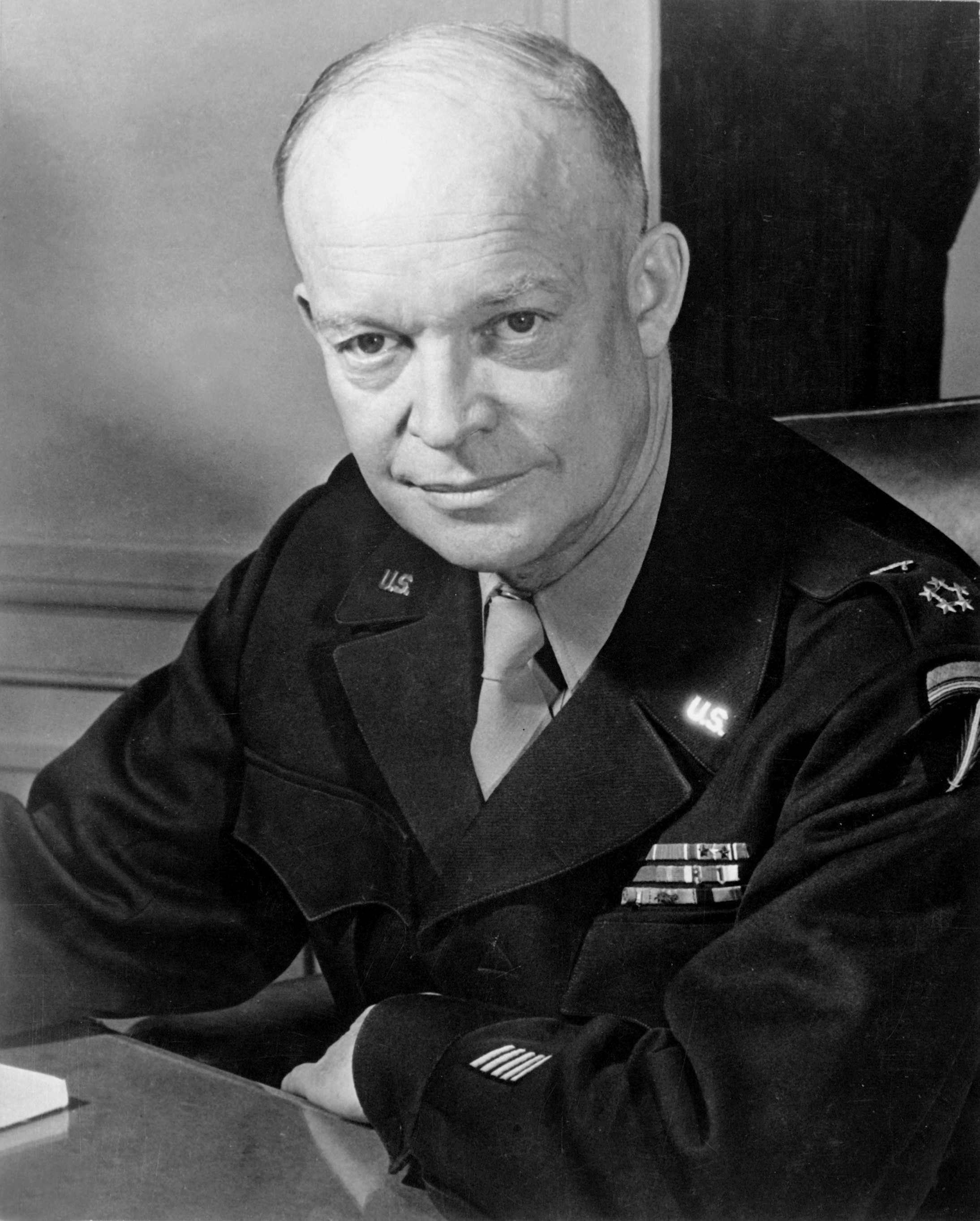
General Dwight D. Eisenhower, Commander in Chief of the Allied forces.

Field Marshal Henry Maitland Wilson succeeded Eisenhower in the Mediterranean theatre, given the title Supreme Allied Commander Mediterranean. Wilson was succeeded by Field Marshal Harold Alexander, who continued in charge of those Allied forces until the end of the war, accepting the unconditional surrender of all German forces in Italy.

Admiral Lord Louis Mountbatten was Supreme Allied Commander South East Asia (SACSEA) throughout most of its existence, after being promoted to the position on 25 August 1943. He remained in the position until 31 May 1946, eventually being replaced by Lieutenant General Stopford. Stopford remained as SACSEA until the position was dissolved on 30 November 1946.

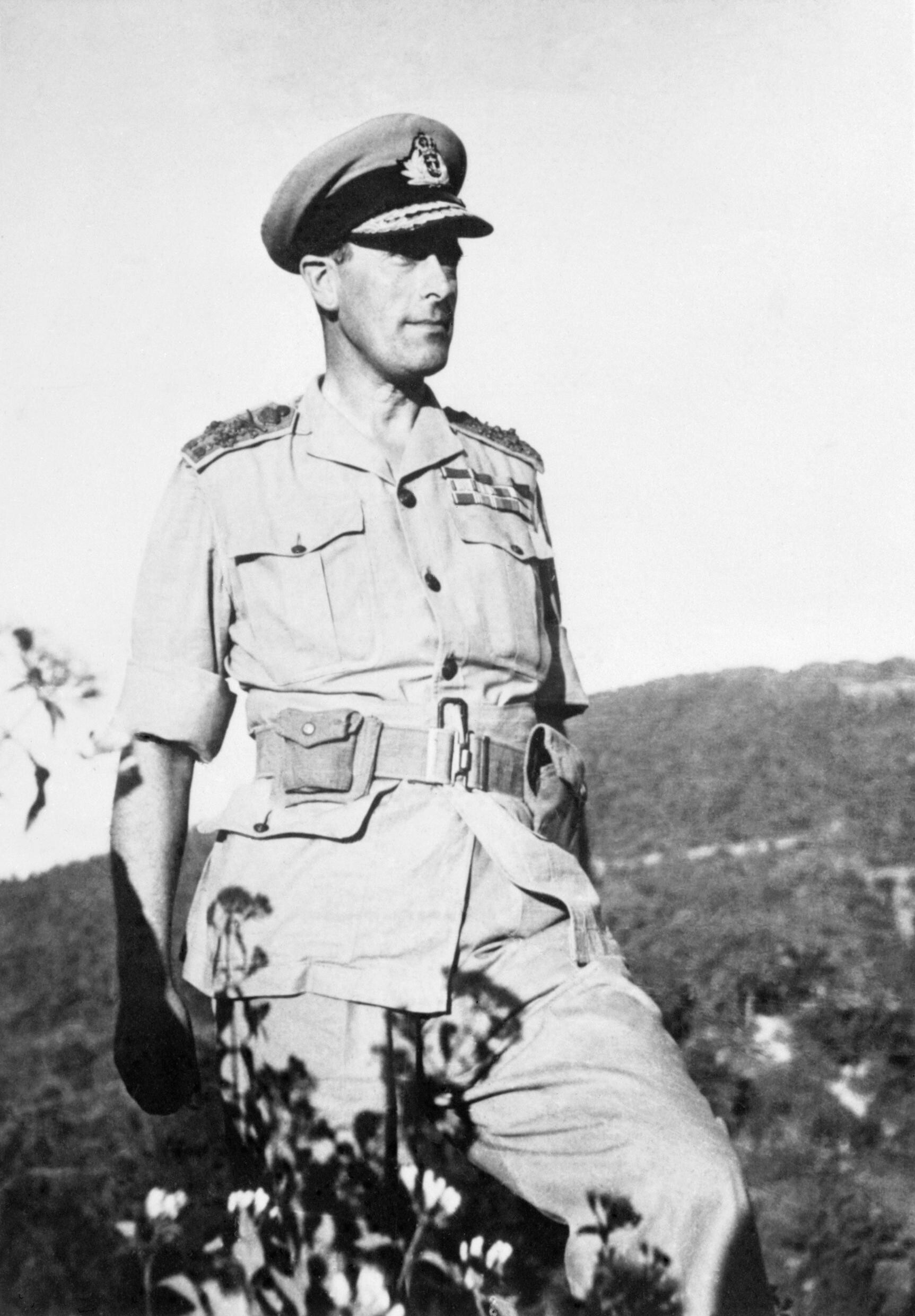
Louis Mountbatten, 1st Earl Mountbatten of Burma shortly after becoming SACSEA

Generalissimo Chiang Kai-shek was named the Supreme Commander of Allied forces in China Theater on 1942. However, US forces in China were usually overseen by General Joseph Stilwell, the commander of China Burma India Theater (CBI) and Deputy Allied Commander of South East Asia Command (SEAC). Due to disagreements with Chiang, it was not until late 1944 that the land forces chain of command was clarified, after Stilwell was recalled to Washington. His overall role, and the CBI command were then split among three people: Lt Gen. Raymond Wheeler became Deputy Supreme Allied Commander South East Asia; Maj. Gen. Albert Wedemeyer became Chief of Staff to Chiang, and commander of US Forces, China Theater (USFCT). Lt Gen. Daniel Sultan was promoted, from deputy commander of CBI to commander of US Forces, India-Burma Theater (USFIBT) and commander of the NCAC.

General of the Army Douglas MacArthur was appointed Supreme Allied Commander, South West Pacific Area (SWPA) on 18 April 1942. However, he preferred to use the title Commander-in-Chief. During the Allied occupation of Japan following the war, MacArthur held the title of Supreme Commander for the Allied Powers (SCAP). The Pacific Ocean Areas (POA), divided into the Central Pacific Area, the North Pacific Area and the South Pacific Area, were commanded by Admiral Chester W. Nimitz, Commander-in-Chief Pacific Ocean Areas.

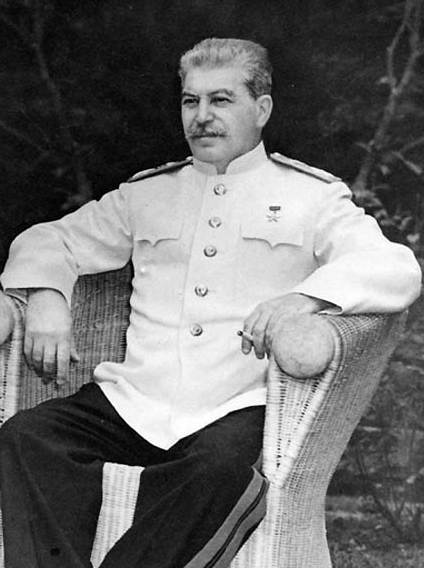
Joseph Stalin at the Potsdam Conference. Here, he is seen wearing his white tunic as Marshal of the Soviet Union.

Although not bearing any official title of Supreme Allied Commander, Joseph Stalin, acted as Supreme Commander-in-Chief of the Soviet Armed Forces. On 14 May 1943, Stalin named himself Marshal of the Soviet Union. Stalin also functioned as the Stavka of the Supreme Commander (which would become Supreme High Command), whose role was to evaluate military strategy in the Soviet Union. Top representatives of Stavka included Georgy Zhukov and Alexander Vasilevsky who served as a link between Moscow and field commanders.

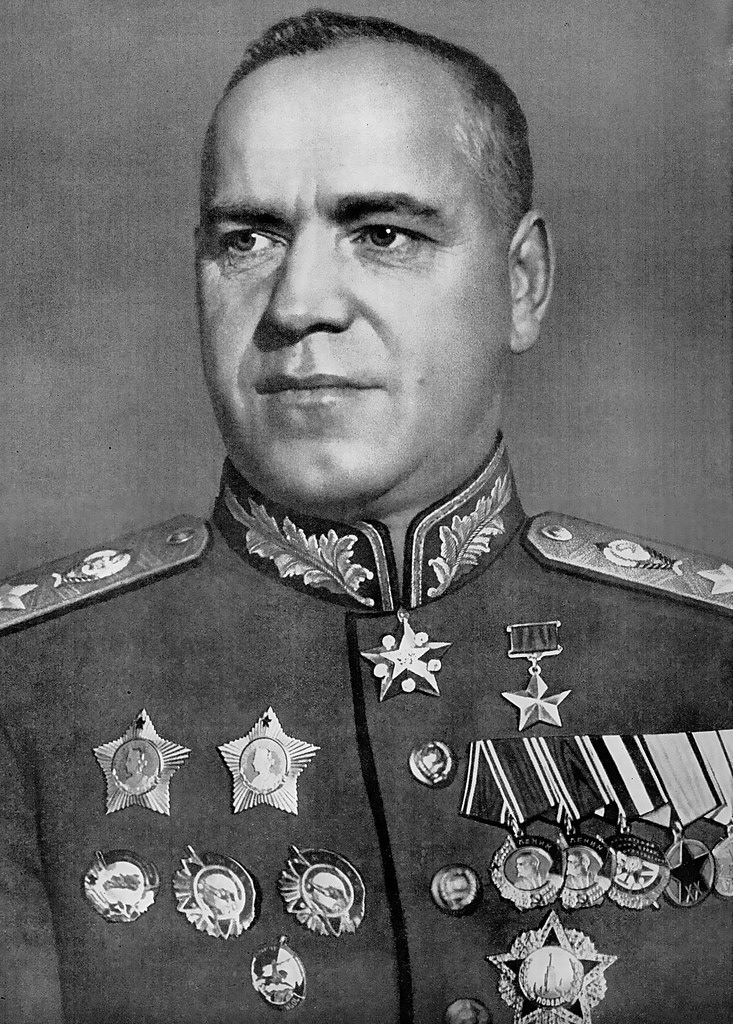
Georgy Zhukov, a commander of Stavka

== Cold War-era to present-day titles ==
The term came into use again with the formation of NATO in 1949. In the spring of 1951, Allied Command Europe was established, led by Eisenhower. He became the Supreme Allied Commander (SACEUR). In 1952, Allied Command Atlantic was established, at Norfolk, Virginia, under Lynde McCormick, a U.S. Navy admiral. His title was Supreme Allied Commander Atlantic (SACLANT), and the entire command was usually known as SACLANT. On 29 July 2009, General Stéphane Abrial became the first to be appointed to the position (now known as Supreme Allied Commander Transformation), becoming the first European to do so.

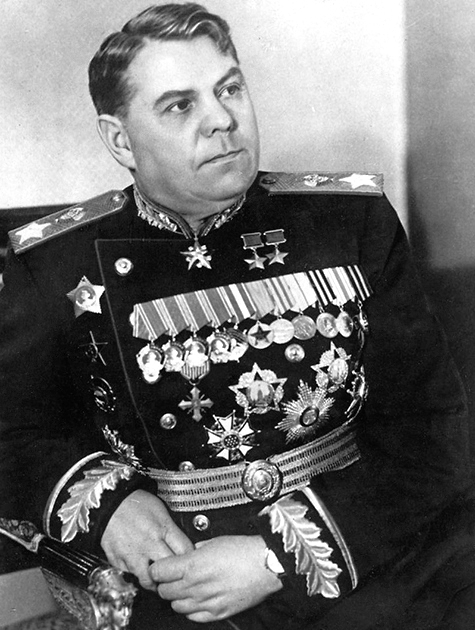
Aleksandr Vasilevsky, a commander of Stavka

Responding to the establishment of NATO, the Warsaw Pact was established in 1955 along with their own equivalent posts, such as Supreme Commander of Warsaw Pact Forces, with Ivan Konev being the first to be promoted to the position.

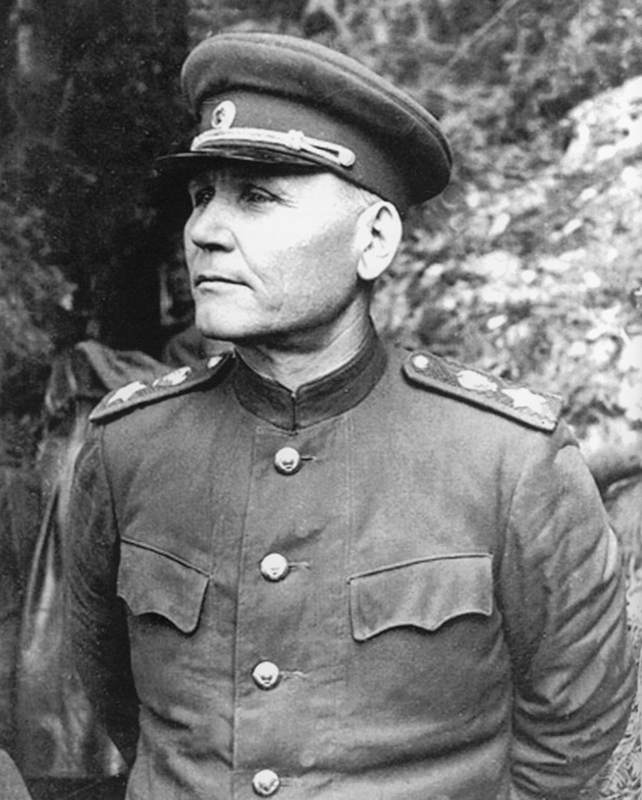
Ivan Konev, Supreme Commander of Warsaw Pact Forces

In June 2003, a new command structure was organised. One command was given responsibility for operations, and one for transforming the military components of the alliance to meet new challenges. In Europe, Allied Command Operations was established from the former Allied Command Europe, and given responsibility for all NATO military operations worldwide. However, for legal reasons (Note: There was concern that abbreviations ending with "o" carried negative connotations (e.g. psycho or wacko). Other reasons include numerous agreements signed over the years by SHAPE.), SACEUR retained the traditional title including Europe. In the United States, SACLANT was decommissioned and Allied Command Transformation established. The headquarters of ACT is at the former SACLANT headquarters in Norfolk, Virginia, USA. Each has a Supreme Allied Commander reports to the NATO Military Committee, currently held by Admiral Giuseppe Cavo Dragone.

- Allied Command Operations (ACO) has its headquarters at Supreme Headquarters Allied Powers Europe (SHAPE), at Mons, Belgium. It is headed by the Supreme Allied Commander Europe (SACEUR), a U.S. four-star general or admiral also heading U.S. European Command. The current Commander is General Alexus Grynkewich (Air Force), who succeeded General Christopher G. Cavoli (Army).
- Allied Command Transformation (ACT) is located in Norfolk, Virginia, USA. It is headed by the Supreme Allied Commander Transformation (SACT), a four-star general or admiral. General Stéphane Abrial, the commander from 2009 until 2012, was the first non-American to hold a supreme commander role within NATO. Since then this position has been held by a French Air Force officer. On 23 September 2024 a French Admiral Pierre Vandier became the commander.

== See also ==
- Supreme Headquarters Allied Expeditionary Force
- Supreme Headquarters Allied Powers Europe
