= Beauvais =

Beauvais Bieuvais (Picard)
- Prefecture and commune
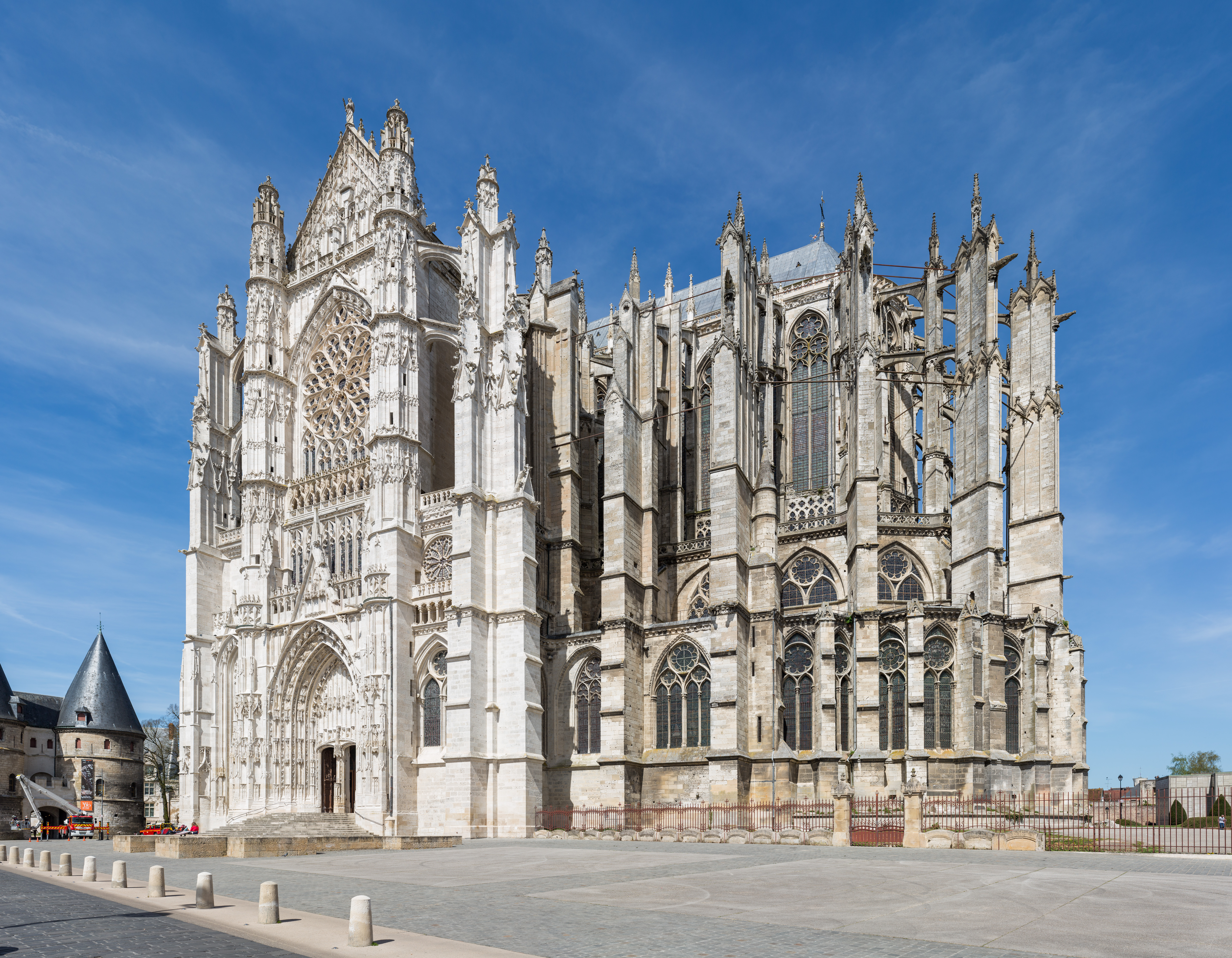
- Beauvais Cathedral

- Coat of arms
- Location of Beauvais
- Location within France Location within Hauts-de-France
- Coordinates: 49°25′49″N 2°05′43″E
- Country: France
- Region: Hauts-de-France
- Department: Oise
- Arrondissement: Beauvais
- Canton: Beauvais-1 and 2
- Intercommunality: CA Beauvaisis

Government
  - Mayor (2022–2026): Franck Pia
- Area^{1}: 33.31 km^{2} (12.86 sq mi)
- Elevation: 67 m (220 ft)
- Highest elevation: 170 m (560 ft)
- Lowest elevation: 57 m (187 ft)
- Population (2023): 55,550
  - Density: 1,668/km^{2} (4,319/sq mi)
- Time zone: UTC+01:00 (CET)
  - Summer (DST): UTC+02:00 (CEST)
- INSEE/Postal code: 60057 /60000
- ^{1} French Land Register data, which excludes lakes, ponds, glaciers > 1 km^{2} (0.386 sq mi or 247 acres) and river estuaries.

Beauvais (US: /boʊˈveɪ/ boh-VAY; French: [bovɛ]; Picard: Bieuvais) is a town and commune in northern France, and prefecture of the Oise département, in the Hauts-de-France region, 75 kilometres (47 miles) north of Paris.

The commune of Beauvais has a population of 55,550 (2023), making it the most populous town in the Oise department, and serves Paris through Paris Beauvais airport. Together with its suburbs and satellite towns, the metropolitan area of Beauvais has a population of 128,020.

The region around Beauvais is called the Beauvaisis.

== History ==
Beauvais was known to the Romans by the Gallo-Roman name of Caesaromagus (magos is Common Celtic for "field"). The post-Renaissance Latin rendering is Bellovacum from the Belgic tribe, the Bellovaci, whose capital it was. In the ninth century, it became a county (comté), which, in about 1013, passed to the bishops of Beauvais, who became peers of France from the twelfth century. At the coronations of kings, the Bishop of Beauvais wore the royal mantle and went, with the Bishop of Langres, to raise the king from his throne to present him to the people.

De Bello Gallico II 13 reports that as Julius Caesar was approaching a fortified town called Bratuspantium in the land of the Bellovaci, its inhabitants surrendered to him when he was about 5 Roman miles away. Its name is Gaulish for "place where judgements are made", from *bratu-spantion. Some say that Bratuspantium is Beauvais. Others theorise that it is Vendeuil-Caply or Bailleul sur Thérain.

From 1004 to 1037, the Count of Beauvais was Odo II, Count of Blois.

In a charter dated 1056/1060, Eudo of Brittany granted land "in pago Belvacensi" (Beauvais, Picardy) to the Abbey of Angers Saint-Aubin (see Albinus of Angers). (Note: Perhaps inherited through his father Geoffrey I, Duke of Brittany from the latter's mother Ermengarde-Gerberga of Anjou, as she is known to have owned property there.)

In 1346, the town had to defend itself against the English, who again besieged it in 1433. The siege that it endured in 1472 at the hands of the Duke of Burgundy was rendered famous by the heroism of the town's women, under the leadership of Jeanne Hachette, whose memory is still celebrated by a procession on 27 June (the feast of Sainte Angadrême), during which women take precedence over men.

A significant hoard of coins from the High Middle Ages became known as the Beauvais Hoard because some of the English and European coins found with the lot were from the French abbey located in Beauvais. The hoard, which contained a variety of rare and extremely rare Anglo-Norman pennies, English and foreign coins, was reputed to have been found in or near Paris.

Beauvais was extensively damaged during World War I, and again in World War II during the German advance on Paris in June 1940. Much of the older part of the city was all but destroyed, and the cathedral was badly damaged before being liberated by British forces on 30 August 1944.

Beauvais experienced significant rioting during the Nahel Merzouk protests in 2023.

== Geography ==
Beauvais lies at the foot of wooded hills on the left bank of the Thérain at its confluence with the Avelon. Its ancient ramparts have been destroyed, and it is now surrounded by boulevards, outside of which run branches of the Thérain. In addition, there are spacious promenades in the north-east of the town.

=== Climate ===
Beauvais experiences an oceanic climate (Köppen climate classification Cfb). The average annual temperature is 9.9 °C (1961–1990), and the sunlight annual average of 1669 hours (1991–2010). Hills Bray is provided for the precipitation of Beauvais. The precipitation is 669 mm on average per year (1981–2010), while it is 800 mm on average per year in Bray. However, the frequency of rainfall is high. The average number of days per year above the precipitation of 1 mm is 116 days or every third day. The fog is often present, it is estimated at 55 days a year. The department is affected by 41 days of average wind year, usually, it comes from the west to the south.

Climate data for Beauvais - Tille (BVA), elevation: 89 m (292 ft) (1991–2020 normals, extremes 1944–present)
Month	Jan	Feb	Mar	Apr	May	Jun	Jul	Aug	Sep	Oct	Nov	Dec	Year
Record high °C (°F)	15.6 (60.1)	20.4 (68.7)	24.8 (76.6)	28.4 (83.1)	32.4 (90.3)	38.9 (102.0)	41.6 (106.9)	39.0 (102.2)	34.8 (94.6)	28.2 (82.8)	20.2 (68.4)	17.0 (62.6)	41.6 (106.9)
Mean daily maximum °C (°F)	6.7 (44.1)	7.8 (46.0)	11.6 (52.9)	15.2 (59.4)	18.6 (65.5)	21.8 (71.2)	24.4 (75.9)	24.4 (75.9)	20.6 (69.1)	15.7 (60.3)	10.4 (50.7)	7.1 (44.8)	15.4 (59.7)
Daily mean °C (°F)	4.1 (39.4)	4.5 (40.1)	7.3 (45.1)	9.8 (49.6)	13.2 (55.8)	16.4 (61.5)	18.6 (65.5)	18.6 (65.5)	15.4 (59.7)	11.7 (53.1)	7.4 (45.3)	4.5 (40.1)	11.0 (51.8)
Mean daily minimum °C (°F)	1.4 (34.5)	1.2 (34.2)	3.0 (37.4)	4.4 (39.9)	7.9 (46.2)	11.0 (51.8)	12.8 (55.0)	12.9 (55.2)	10.1 (50.2)	7.6 (45.7)	4.3 (39.7)	1.8 (35.2)	6.5 (43.7)
Record low °C (°F)	−19.7 (−3.5)	−16.8 (1.8)	−12.1 (10.2)	−6.9 (19.6)	−2.4 (27.7)	1.2 (34.2)	3.6 (38.5)	3.9 (39.0)	−0.5 (31.1)	−5.0 (23.0)	−10.9 (12.4)	−15.7 (3.7)	−19.7 (−3.5)
Average precipitation mm (inches)	53.8 (2.12)	44.9 (1.77)	45.8 (1.80)	44.5 (1.75)	60.6 (2.39)	53.0 (2.09)	54.0 (2.13)	57.8 (2.28)	48.5 (1.91)	58.1 (2.29)	58.4 (2.30)	76.1 (3.00)	655.5 (25.81)
Average precipitation days (≥ 1.0 mm)	11.1	9.7	9.3	9.0	9.0	8.5	8.2	8.2	8.0	10.1	11.1	12.7	114.9
Average snowy days	3.6	4.3	1.9	0.8	0.0	0.0	0.0	0.0	0.0	0.0	1.1	2.6	14.3
Average relative humidity (%)	89	85	80	76	76	76	73	74	79	85	89	90	81
Average dew point °C (°F)	2 (36)	2 (36)	3 (37)	5 (41)	9 (48)	12 (54)	13 (55)	13 (55)	11 (52)	9 (48)	6 (43)	3 (37)	7 (45)
Mean monthly sunshine hours	59.5	78.5	127.2	178.8	203.3	208.9	219.8	208.1	163.8	112.2	67.6	54.6	1,682.2
Source 1: Meteociel (snowy days 1981-2010)
Source 2: Time and Date

== Population ==
The population data in the table and graph below refer to the commune of Beauvais proper in its geography at the given years. The commune of Beauvais absorbed the former communes of Marissel, Saint-Just-des-Marais and Voisinlieu and part of Notre-Dame-du-Thil in 1943.

Historical population

Year	Pop.	±% p.a.
1793	12,449	—
1800	12,392	−0.07%
1806	13,183	+1.04%
1821	12,798	−0.20%
1831	12,867	+0.05%
1836	13,082	+0.33%
1841	13,925	+1.26%
1846	14,527	+0.85%
1851	14,216	−0.43%
1856	14,286	+0.10%
1861	15,364	+1.47%
1866	13,609	−2.40%
1872	13,541	−0.08%
1876	16,600	+5.22%
1881	17,525	+1.09%
1886	18,441	+1.02%
1891	19,382	+1.00%
1896	19,906	+0.53%
1901	20,300	+0.39%

Year	Pop.	±% p.a.
1906	20,248	−0.05%
1911	19,841	−0.41%
1921	19,270	−0.29%
1926	19,387	+0.12%
1931	18,738	−0.68%
1936	18,869	+0.14%
1946	23,156	+2.07%
1954	26,756	+1.82%
1962	33,995	+3.04%
1968	46,777	+5.46%
1975	54,089	+2.10%
1982	52,365	−0.46%
1990	54,190	+0.43%
1999	55,392	+0.24%
2007	55,230	−0.04%
2012	54,289	−0.34%
2017	56,254	+0.71%
2023	55,550	−0.21%

Source: EHESS and INSEE (1968-2023)

== Sights ==
=== Cathedral ===
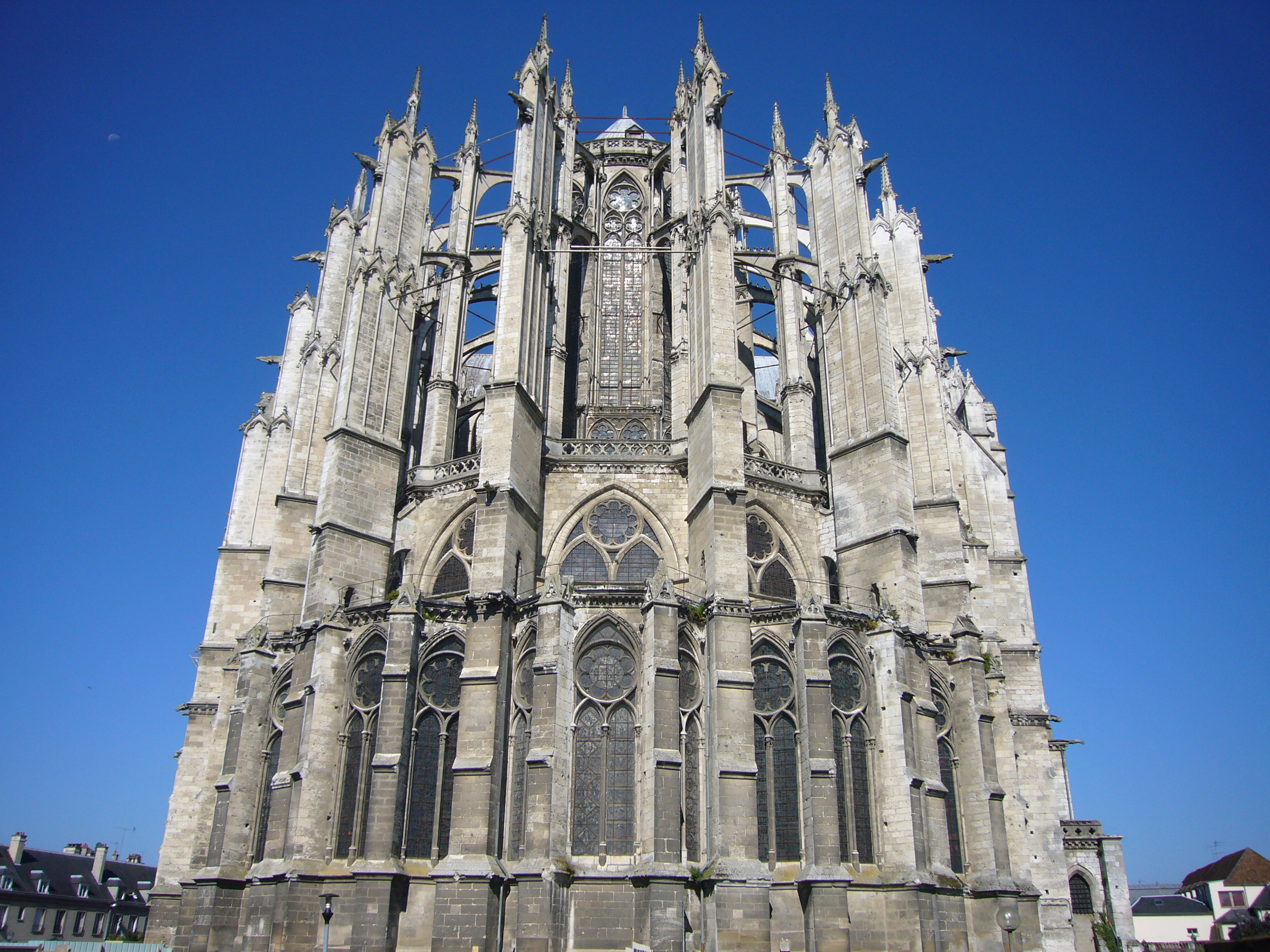
Cathédrale Saint-Pierre

The city's cathedral, dedicated to Saint Peter (Cathédrale Saint-Pierre de Beauvais), in some respects, the most daring achievement of Gothic architecture, consists only of a transept and quire with apse and seven apse-chapels. The vaulting in the interior exceeds 46 m or 150 feet in height. The cathedral underwent a major repair and restoration process in 2008.

The small Romanesque church of the 10th century known as the Basse Oeuvre occupies the site destined for the nave; much of its east end was demolished to make room for the new cathedral.

Begun in 1247, under Bishop William of Grès (Guillaume de Grès, Guillaume de Grez), an extra 5 metres (16 feet) were added to the height, to make it the tallest cathedral in Europe: the work was interrupted in 1284 by the collapse of the vaulting of the choir, a disaster that produced a temporary failure of nerve among the masons working in Gothic style. The transept was built from 1500 to 1548. In 1573 the fall of a too-ambitious central tower stopped work again, after which little addition was made.

Its façades, especially that on the south, exhibit the late Gothic style. The carved wooden doors of both the north and the south portals are respectively of Gothic and Renaissance workmanship. The church possesses an astronomical clock (1866) and tapestries of the fifteenth and seventeenth centuries; but its chief artistic accomplishments are stained glass windows of the thirteenth, fourteenth and sixteenth centuries, made by Renaissance artist, Engrand Le Prince, a native of Beauvais. To him also due to some of the stained glass in St. Etienne, the second church of the town, and an example of the transition stage between the Romanesque and Gothic styles.

During the Middle Ages, on 14 January, the Feast of Asses was celebrated in the Beauvais Cathedral, in commemoration of the Flight into Egypt.

=== Other notable sites ===
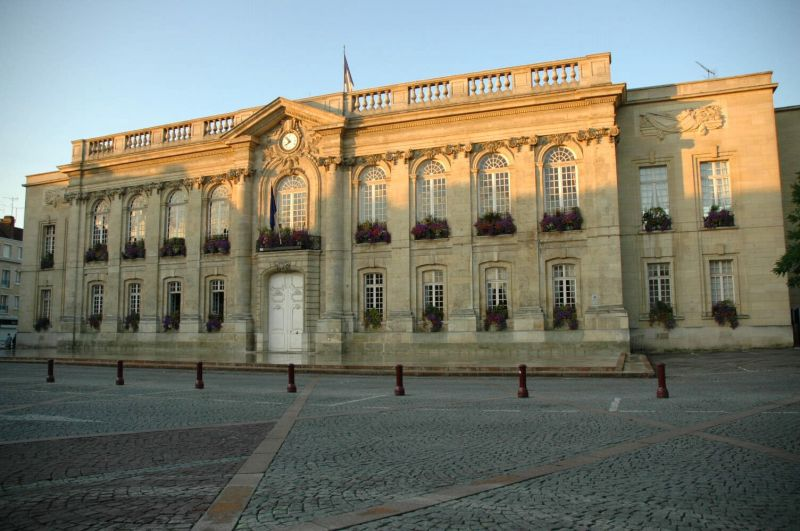
The Hôtel de Ville

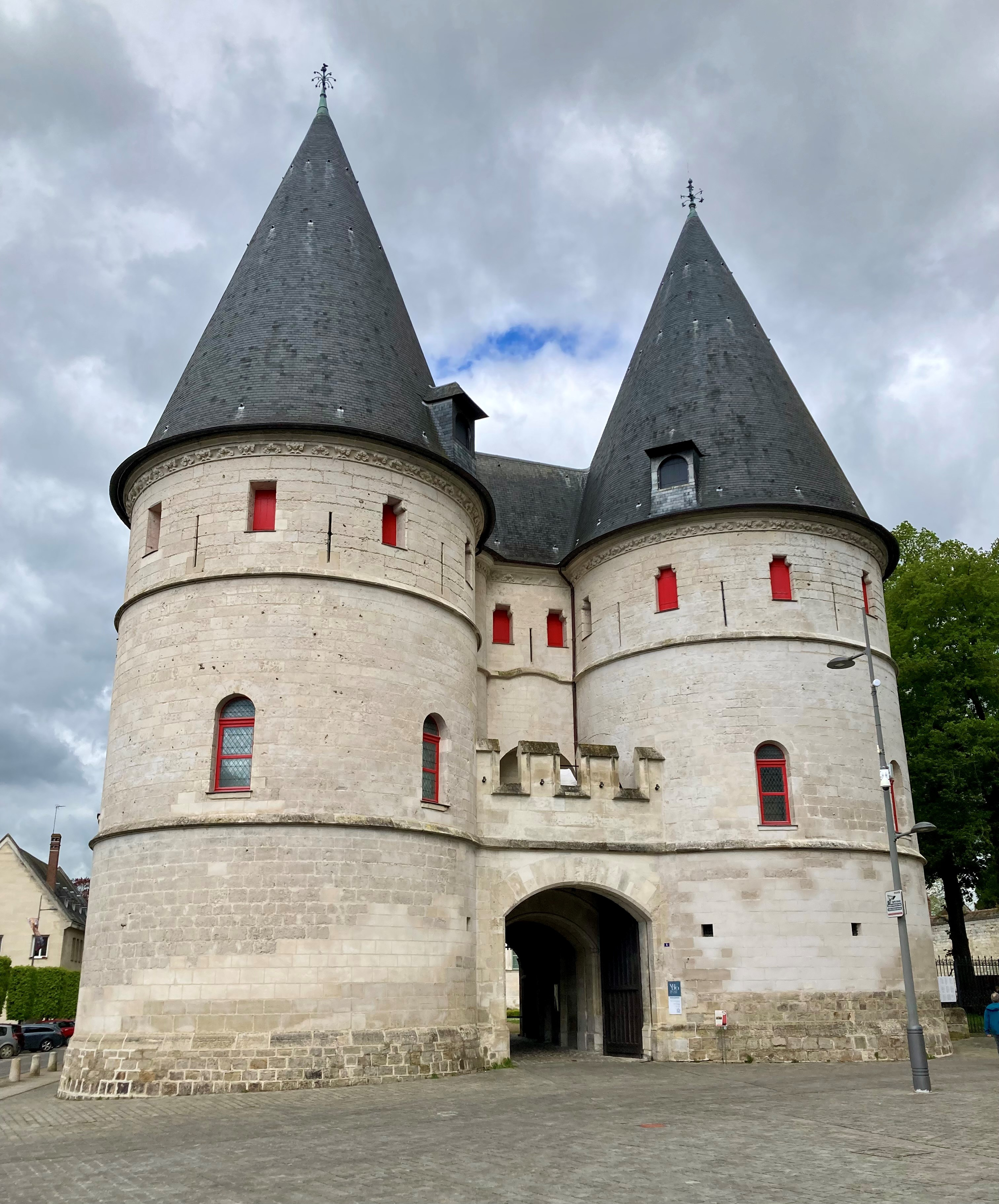
Bishop's palace

In the Place de l'Hôtel de Ville and the old streets near the cathedral, several houses are dating from the 12th to the 16th centuries. The Hôtel de Ville, close to which stands the statue of Jeanne Hachette, was built in 1753.

The episcopal palace, now housing the Musée départemental de l'Oise, was built in the 16th century, partly upon the Gallo-Roman fortifications. The church of Saint-Étienne is a Romanesque-Gothic building (early 12th-late 16th centuries), including, in one of its transept's portals, a sculpture of the "Wheel of fortune".

== Transport ==
=== Rail transport ===
The railway station, Gare de Beauvais, opened in 1857 is currently served by several TER lines:

- Beauvais – PersanBeaumont – Paris Gare du Nord
- Beauvais – Creil
- Beauvais – Abancourt – Le Tréport

=== Air transport ===
Beauvais–Tillé Airport, dating from the 1930s, lies in the north of the city, in Tillé. It is used as a gateway to Paris by several low-cost carriers. Traffic growth is significant: in 1997, 200,000 passengers used it annually, but by 2006, it was more than 1.8 million. Airport usage increased by 40% a year on average between 2001 and 2005. The airport is mainly used for passenger traffic (only 2 to 3 flights involve freight each month) and serves 48 destinations. The nearest major airport is Paris's Charles de Gaulle Airport, which is located 73 km (45 mi) to the south east of Beauvais. The airport provides more domestic and international destinations.

On 5 October 1930, the British airship R101 crashed just outside Beauvais on its maiden overseas voyage, killing 48 of the 54 people on board.

=== Public transport ===
Public transport in Beauvais is provided by Corolis (formerly The Urban Transport network of Beauvaisis French: Transports Urbains du Beauvaisis or TUB). The transit bus (commuter bus) network consists of 25 regular lines which serve Beauvais and its suburbs, including:

- 12 day lines
  - 1 2 3 4 5 6 7 8 9 12 13 14
- 3 Sunday lines
  - 11A 11B 11C
- 3 summer lines
  - 10 (divided into 3 sub lines)
- 7 Demand responsive transport lines
  - T1 T2 T3 T5 T6 T7 T8
- 3 shuttles
  - Navette Aéroport (Airport Shuttle) Navette Parking (Parking Shuttle) Navette LaSalle (Polytechnic Institute of LaSalle Shuttle)

=== Environmentally friendly transportation ===
To promote cleaner urban transportation and protect the environment, the city began to develop a "Green Plan" (Plan vert). Ultimately, the goal is to have a network of 20 km (12 mi) bicycle paths.

== Administration ==
The mayor of Beauvais is Franck Pia, elected in September 2022. He succeeded Caroline Cayeux, who stepped down to become a deputy minister in the Borne government.

== Notable people ==
- Dominique Ansel, pastry chef and creator of the Cronut (b. 1978)
- George Auriol, born Jean-Georges Huyot, graphic designer (26 April 1863 – February 1938)
- Guillaume Brenner, footballer (b. 10 February 1986)
- Pierre Cauchon, bishop of Beauvais and judge of Joan of Arc (1371 – 18 December 1442)
- Arnaud Démare, professional cyclist (b. 26 August 1991)
- Fanny Dénoix, poet (1798–1879)
- Pierre de Schryder, French resistance fighter (1913–1953)
- Hubert de Givenchy, fashion designer (20 February 1927 – 10 March 2018)
- Charles Janet, engineer and biologist (1849 – 1932)
- Henri Lebesgue, mathematician (28 June 1875 – 26 July 1941)
- Jérôme Lempereur, footballer (b. 1973)
- Clément Lenglet, footballer (b. 17 June 1995)
- Pierre Louvet, historian, archivist and historiographer (1617 – 1684)
- Anthony Mfa Mezui, footballer (b. 7 March 1991)
- Milo of Nanteuil, bishop of Beauvais, builder of the Beauvais Cathedral (d. 1234)
- Alberic of Ostia, bishop of Ostia and diplomat (1080 – 20 November 1148)
- Mustapha Yatabare, footballer (b. 26 January 1986)
- Sambou Yatabare, footballer (b. 2 March 1989)

== Economy ==
The industry of Beauvais comprises, besides the state manufacture of tapestry, which dates from 1664, the manufacture of various kinds of cotton and woollen goods, brushes, toys, boots and shoes, and bricks and tiles. Market-gardening flourishes in the vicinity and an extensive trade is carried on in grain and wine.

The town is the seat of a bishop, a prefect and a Court of Assizes; it has Tribunals of First Instance and commerce, together with a Chamber of Commerce, a branch of the Bank of France, a higher ecclesiastical seminary, a lycée and training colleges.

Amongst the major companies operating in the town are Nestle and Agco (Massey Ferguson). Also present since 1986 is RS Components, founded by Jerry Vaughan, and now operating from a purpose-built distribution centre to the east of the town.

Beauvais also has a small airport, Beauvais Tillé, which is used by several low-cost carriers and charter airlines such as Ryanair as a terminal for nearby Paris, to which frequent shuttle buses run.

== Education ==
As of September 2026 the school directory published by the Ministry of National Education lists 45 primary schools in Beauvais, 42 of them public and three private; seven collèges (middle schools), five public and two private; and eight lycées (high schools), six public and two private. The Lycée Agricole de l'Oise comes under the Ministry of Agriculture and is not covered by that directory.

The public collèges are Henri Baumont, Charles Fauqueux, Jules Michelet, Jean-Baptiste Pellerin and George Sand, and the public lycées are Félix Faure, Jeanne Hachette, Paul Langevin, François Truffaut, Jean-Baptiste Corot and Les Jacobins. The private establishments are the Institution du Saint-Esprit and the Institution Notre-Dame, each running a collège, and the Lycée Saint-Vincent de Paul, which also offers vocational programmes.

Beauvais is also home to UniLaSalle, a private graduate school of engineering formed by the merger of LaSalle Beauvais and ESITPA, with campuses in Beauvais and Rouen.

== Sport ==
Beauvais is home to AS Beauvais Oise, a football club playing in the Championnat National (as of 2006), which is supported by a fine percussion band.

== International relations ==
Beauvais is twinned with:

- Maidstone, United Kingdom, since 1961
- Witten, Germany, since 1975
- Setúbal, Portugal, since 1982
- Dej, Romania, since 2003
- Tczew, Poland, since 2003

== See also ==
- Roman Catholic Diocese of Beauvais
- Communes of the Oise department
- Jeanne Hachette

== Bibliography ==
- Charles Delettre, Histoire du diocèse de Beauvais, depuis son établissement, Volume 2, Harvard Library
