= Pierre Louvet =

French historian, archivist and historiographer

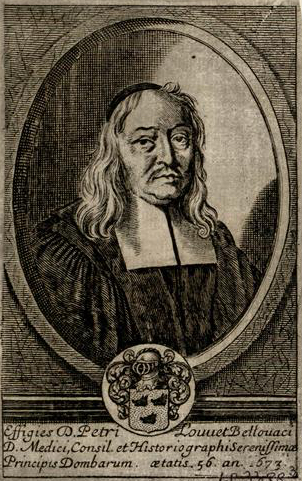
- Born: 3 February 1617; Beauvais
- Died: 1684 (aged 66–67) ?
- Occupations: Historian; Archivist; Historiographer

Pierre Louvet (3 February 1617 – 1684, ?) was a 17th-century French historian, archivist and historiographer. He was one of the few seventeenth-century historians who worked as an archivist and the only one to specialize in local history.

== Main publications ==
- 1657: Remarques sur l'histoire du Languedoc, etc., Toulouse, in-4°; reprinted under the title Abrégé de l'histoire du Languedoc et des princes qui y ont commandé, Nîmes, 1662, in-8°.
- 1659: Traité en forme d'abrégé de l'histoire d'Aquitaine, etc., Bordeaux 1659, in-4°
- 1662-1663: Inventaire du Grand Chartrier, Montpellier, 1 vol.
- 1674: La France dans sa splendeur, Lyon, 2 vol. in-12
- 1676: Abrégé de l'histoire de Provence, Aix en Provence, 2 vol. in-12
- 1679: Histoire des troubles de Provence, depuis son retour à la couronne (1481) jusqu'à la Peace of Vervins (1598), ibid., 2 vol. in-12.
- 1680: Additions et illustrations sur l'histoire de Provence, ibid., 2 vol. in-12
- 1672: Histoire de Villefranche, capitale du Beaujolais, Lyon, in-8°.
- 1673–1680: Le Mercure hollandais, ou Conquete du roi en Hollande, en Franche-Comté, en Allemagne et en Catalogne, depuis l'an 1672 jusqu'à la fin de 1672, Lyon, 10 vol. in-12.

== Sources ==
=== Bibliography ===
- Loïc Ducasse (2011). Faire profession d'historien au XVII : étude de la carrière de Pierre Louvet, 1617-1684 (in French). Vol. I. Paris: École Nationale des Chartes. OCLC 758836560. (This thesis, which is a contribution to the social history of intellectual work, tries to capture the course of Pierre Louvet (1617-1684), a now forgotten historian, who was even, frankly, held negligible in his lifetime, but his career, quite singular, makes a point of interest. Starting from the very bottom of the social ladder, P. Louvet managed somehow to live from history and this, without ever having been clerk or even a servant of a "Great", if fleetingly; instead he applied systematically to local communities in the South of France, offering them his archivist services or offering them, with varying success, his works, mostly local stories, which for much of these were in the form of abstracts of which he partly took his part of the printing costs).
- Pierre Louvet; Joseph Berthelé (1896–1899). Inventaire du "Grand Chartrier". Archives de la ville de Montpellier. Inventaires et Documents 2-3/3 (in French). Vol. I. Montpellier: Serre et Roumégous. OCLC 493311975.
- Joseph-François Michaud; Louis Gabriel Michaud; or Histoire, par ordre alphabétique: de la vie publique et privée de tous les hommes qui se sont fait remarquer par leurs écrits, leurs actions, leurs talents, leurs vertus ou leurs crimes (1820). Biographie universelle, ancienne et moderne (in French). Vol. 25. Michaud frères. pp. 278–279. OCLC 7840944.
- Soubeyran, Benoît (2016-10-07). Des "soldats des guerres diplomatiques", les archivistes de Pierre Dupuy à Ludovico Muratori (XVIIe – début du XVIIIe siècle). La guerre et la paix dans les sociétés des Suds, IVe journées d'études doctorales LLACS (in French). pp. 15–16.
