= Tillé =

- Commune
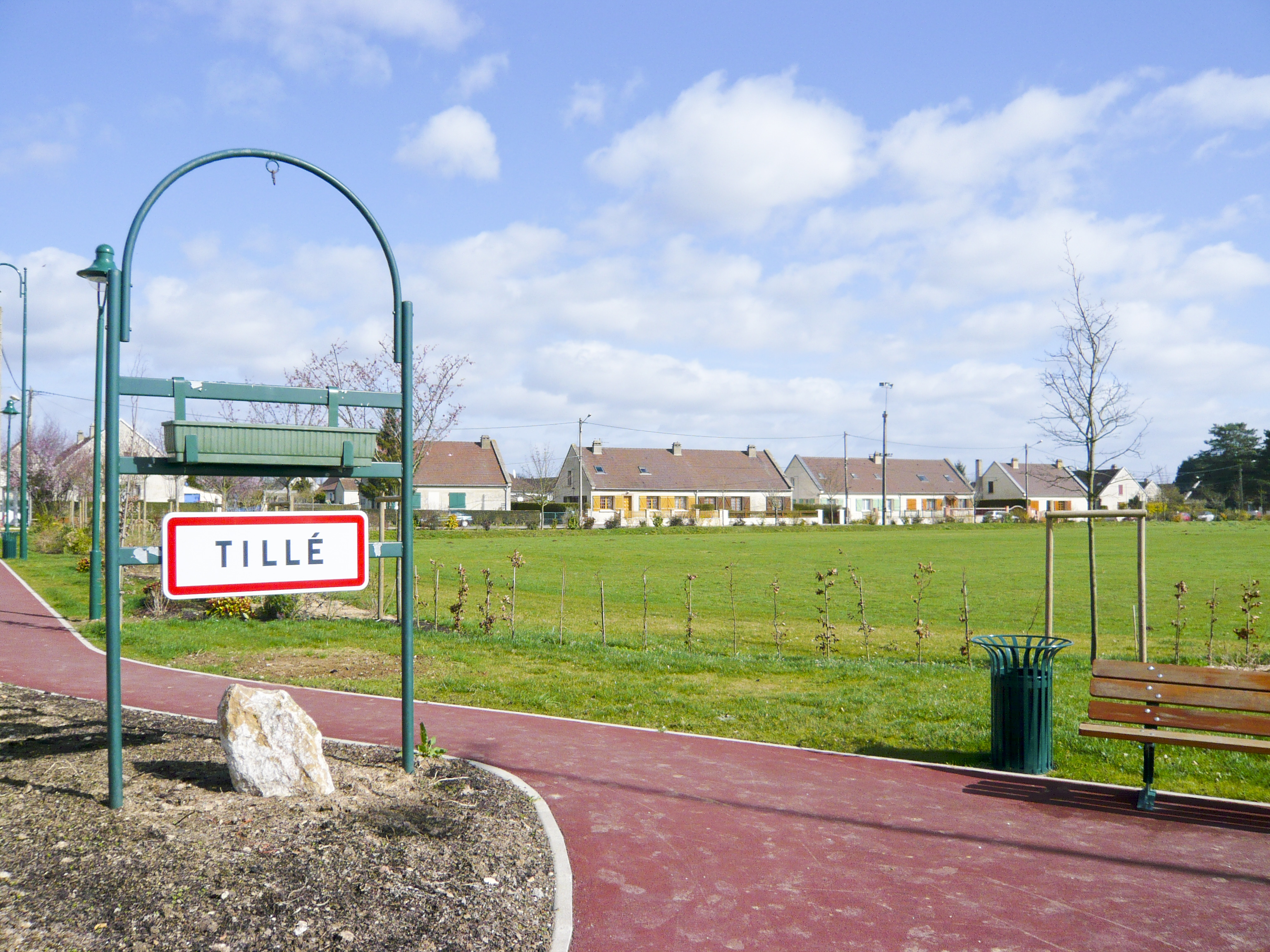
- A path into Tillé
- Location of Tillé
- Location within France Location within Hauts-de-France
- Coordinates: 49°27′51″N 2°06′44″E
- Country: France
- Region: Hauts-de-France
- Department: Oise
- Arrondissement: Beauvais
- Canton: Mouy
- Intercommunality: CA Beauvaisis

Government
  - Mayor (2020–2026): Catherine Martin
- Area^{1}: 14.8 km^{2} (5.7 sq mi)
- Elevation: 112 m (367 ft)
- Highest elevation: 136 m (446 ft)
- Lowest elevation: 81 m (266 ft)
- Population (2023): 1,258
  - Density: 85.0/km^{2} (220/sq mi)
- Time zone: UTC+01:00 (CET)
  - Summer (DST): UTC+02:00 (CEST)
- INSEE/Postal code: 60639 /60000
- ^{1} French Land Register data, which excludes lakes, ponds, glaciers > 1 km^{2} (0.386 sq mi or 247 acres) and river estuaries.

Tillé (French pronunciation: [tije]) is a commune in the Oise department in northern France.

== See also ==
- Beauvais-Tillé Airport
- Communes of the Oise department
