= St Theobald's Church, Thann =

Coordinates: 47°48′39″N 7°6′6″E

- Collégiale Saint-Thiébaut
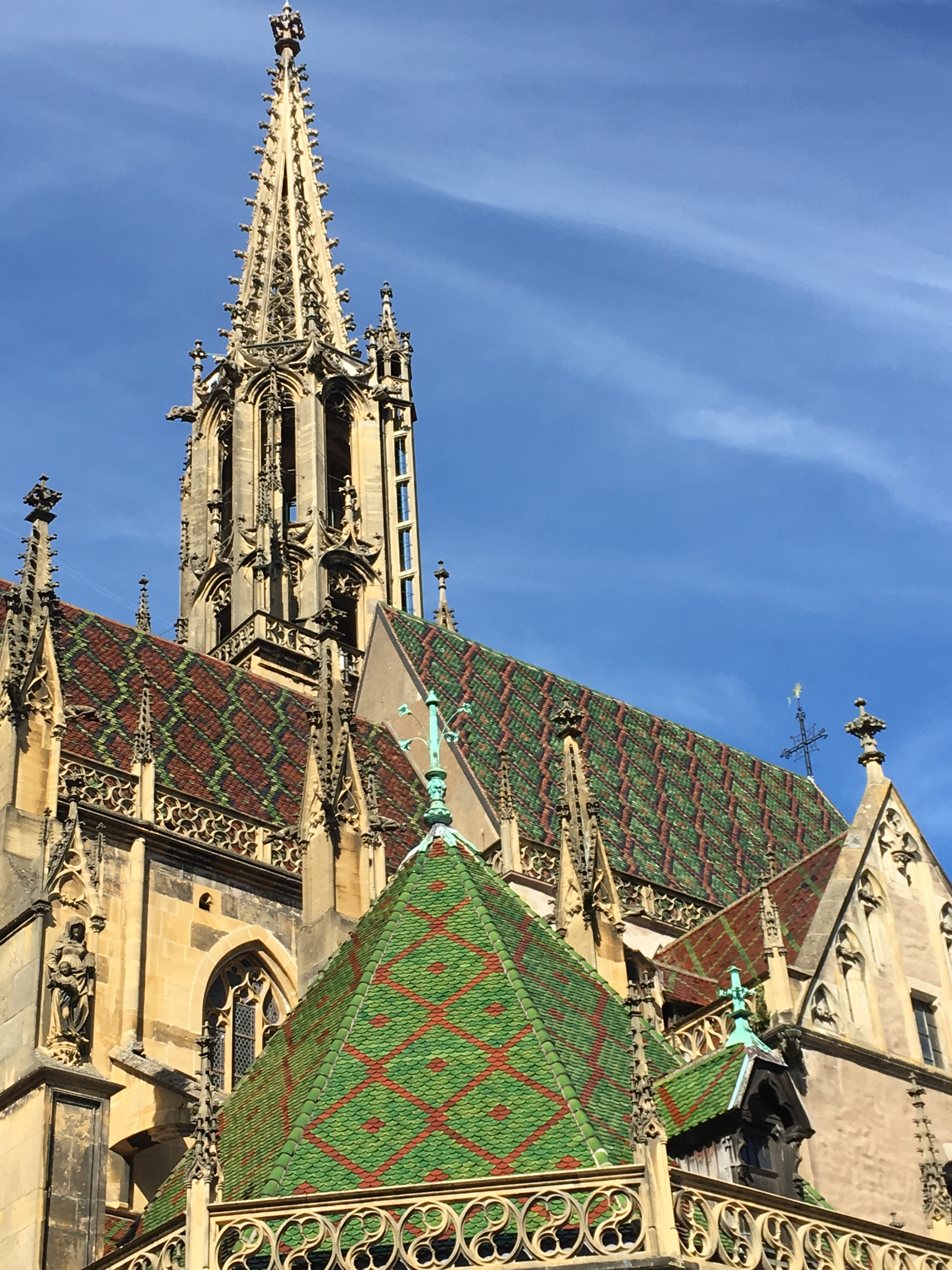
- St Theobald's Church, Thann
- Location: Thann, Haut-Rhin
- Country: France
- Denomination: Roman Catholic Church

History
- Founded: 1332

Architecture
- Heritage designation: Monument historique
- Designated: 1841
- Style: Gothic architecture
- Completed: 1516

Specifications
- Length: 45 m (148 ft) (inside)
- Height: 76 m (249 ft)

Administration
- Archdiocese: Strasbourg

The Collégiale Saint-Thiébaut (Saint-Theobald collegiate church) in Thann, Haut-Rhin is one of the most ornate Gothic churches in the whole Upper Rhenish region (Alsace, Baden, North-Western Switzerland, Palatinate). Of its 76 meters high spire, it is said that "The spire of Strasbourg is the highest, the spire of Freiburg is the broadest but the spire of Thann is the prettiest." In spite of its name, the church is actually dedicated to Saint-Ubald, of which it keeps a finger as a relic. It is listed as a Monument historique since 1841 by the French Ministry of Culture.

== The building ==
The building was erected between 1332 (South lateral nave) and 1516 (achievement of the tower by master Rémy (or Remigius) Faesch from Basel). It was damaged during World War II.

With a height of 16 m (52 ft) and a width of 8 m (26 ft), the main portal of the western façade (1342–1498) is one of the most outstanding features of the church. The main tympanum, depicting 21 scenes of the life of Saint-Mary is framed by a quintuple row of sculpted archivolts, each representing several dozens of other biblical scenes, while the smaller tympana below (the northern one depicting the Crucifixion of Jesus and the southern one depicting the Birth of Christ and the Adoration of the Magi) are framed by a double row of archivolts, also depicting biblical scenes. The portal is further decorated on all sides by larger than life statues of saints displaying their attributes or acting out scenes. The whole represents one of the most ornate and elaborate examples of a "Poor Man's Bible" to be seen.

The north side of the church also presents a remarkable, if somewhat smaller portal (1415), less ornate as for its sculptures but architecturally more elaborate. The outside walls of the church are decorated all around by a total of 87 statues of saints.

Another striking feature of the church is the multicolored tile roof, not unlikely to the neighbouring St. Martin church's in Colmar.

The inside of the church is as richly ornate as the outside. The choir is the most decorated part: stained glass windows (15th century), stalls (1442, expanded 1902–1906), 12 statues of Apostles (15th century), Baroque paintings (1719 and 1733). Other parts of the church display statues (Virgin with child, 1510; Saint Ubald, 16th century; Jesus bearing the cross, 17th century), remains of frescoes (15th and 16th century), a baptismal font from the 16th century, a pulpit of 1629 and several Gothic revival statues and altars.

The church's organ's pipes and mechanism had to be replaced in 2001, but Saint-Thiébaut still keeps its magnificent Gothic Revival organ case of 1888.

=== Inside dimensions ===
- Central nave: 23 m (75 ft) long, 11 m (36 ft) wide, 22 m (72 ft) high
- Choir: 22 m (72 ft) long, 22 m (72 ft) high
- Southern lateral nave: 5 m (16 ft) wide, 10 m (33 ft) high
- Height of the choir windows: 15 m (49 ft)

== Gallery ==
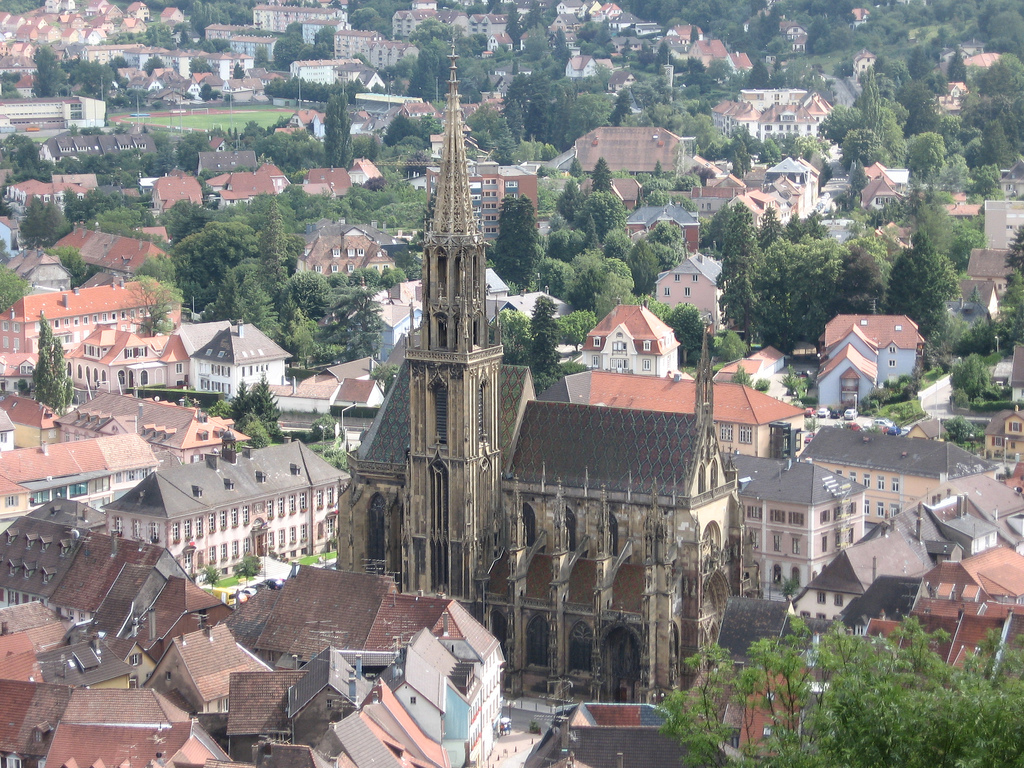
The church seen from the castle ruin Château de l’Engelbourg (aka L'Œil de la sorcière)

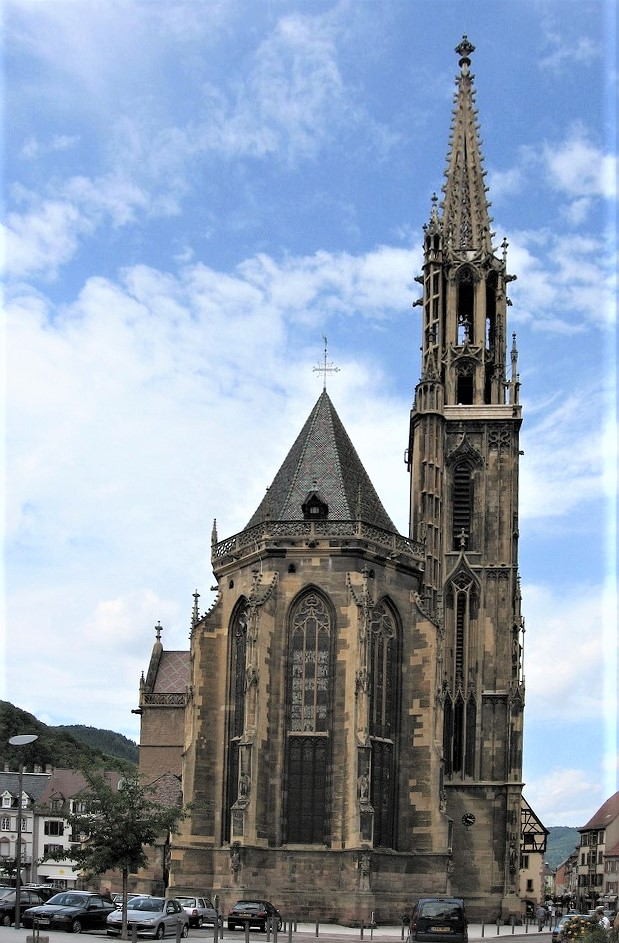
Rear view of the church

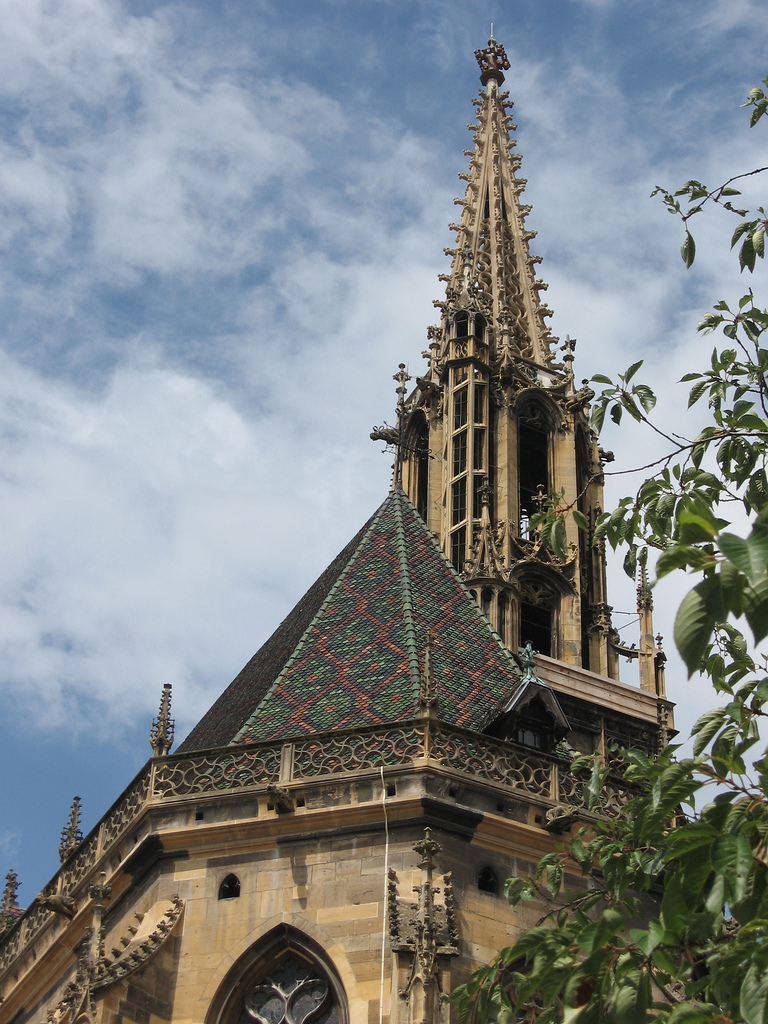
Detail of couloured tiled roof and of spire

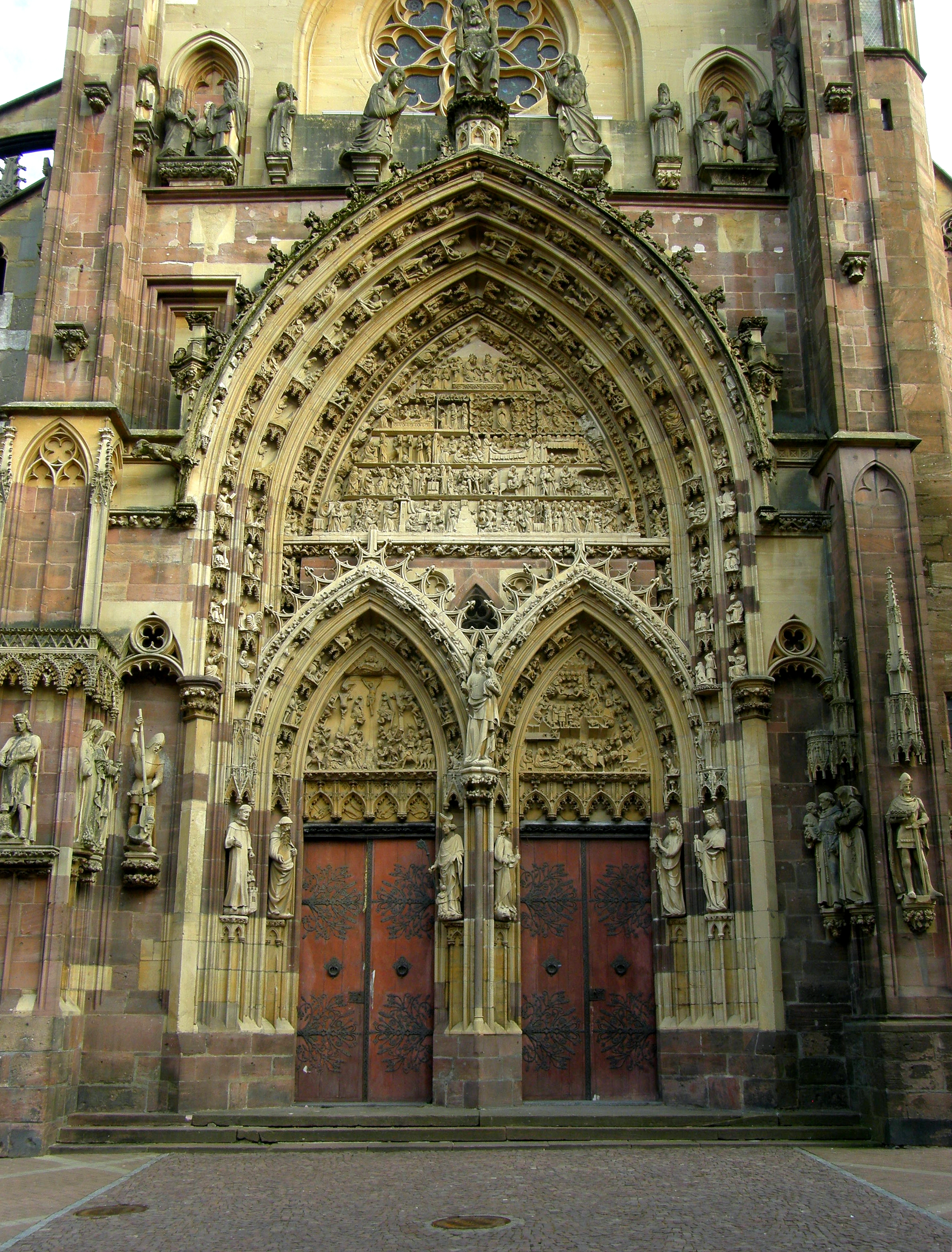
West façade: the portal

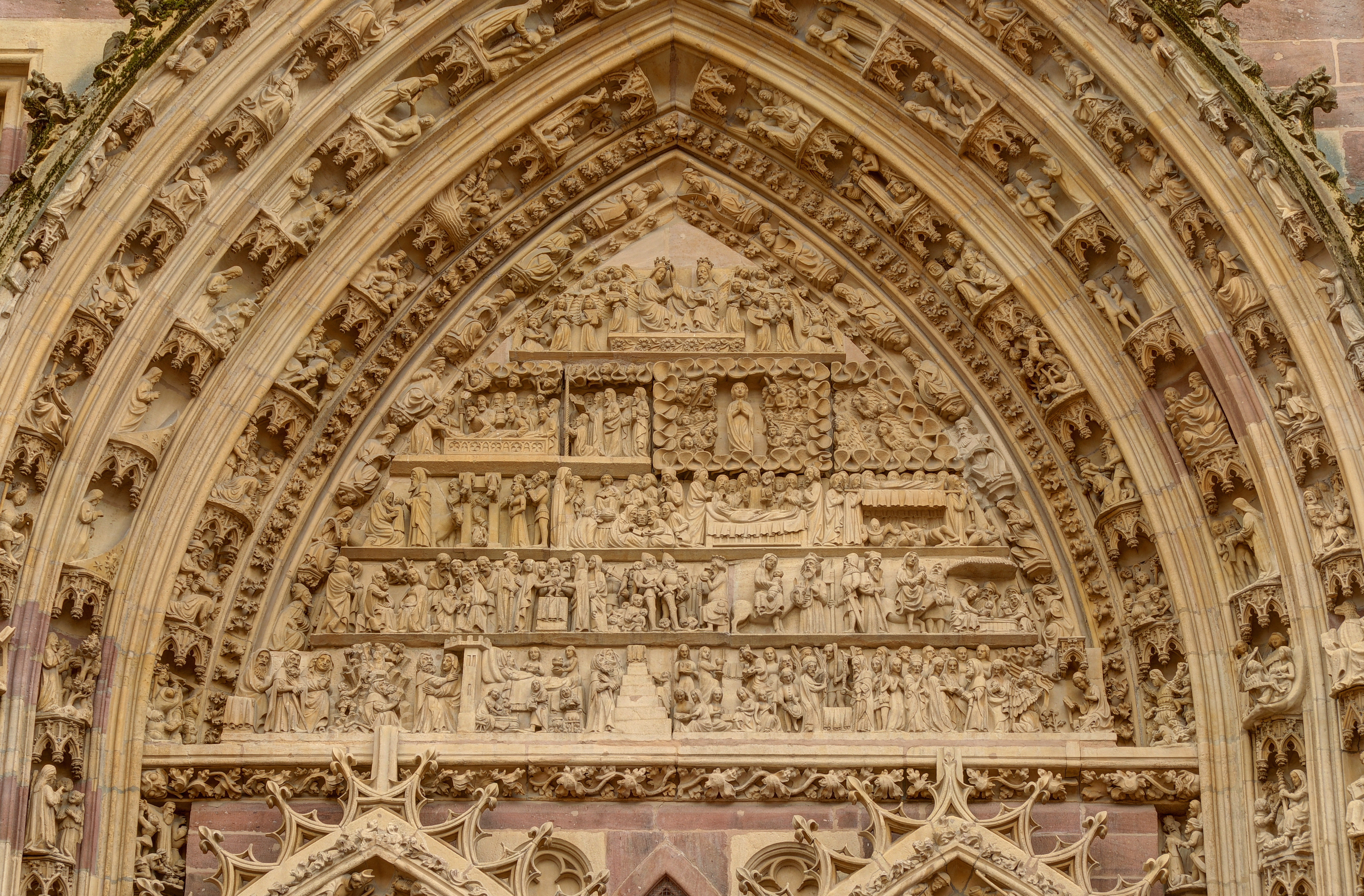
West façade: upper (main) tympanum of the portal

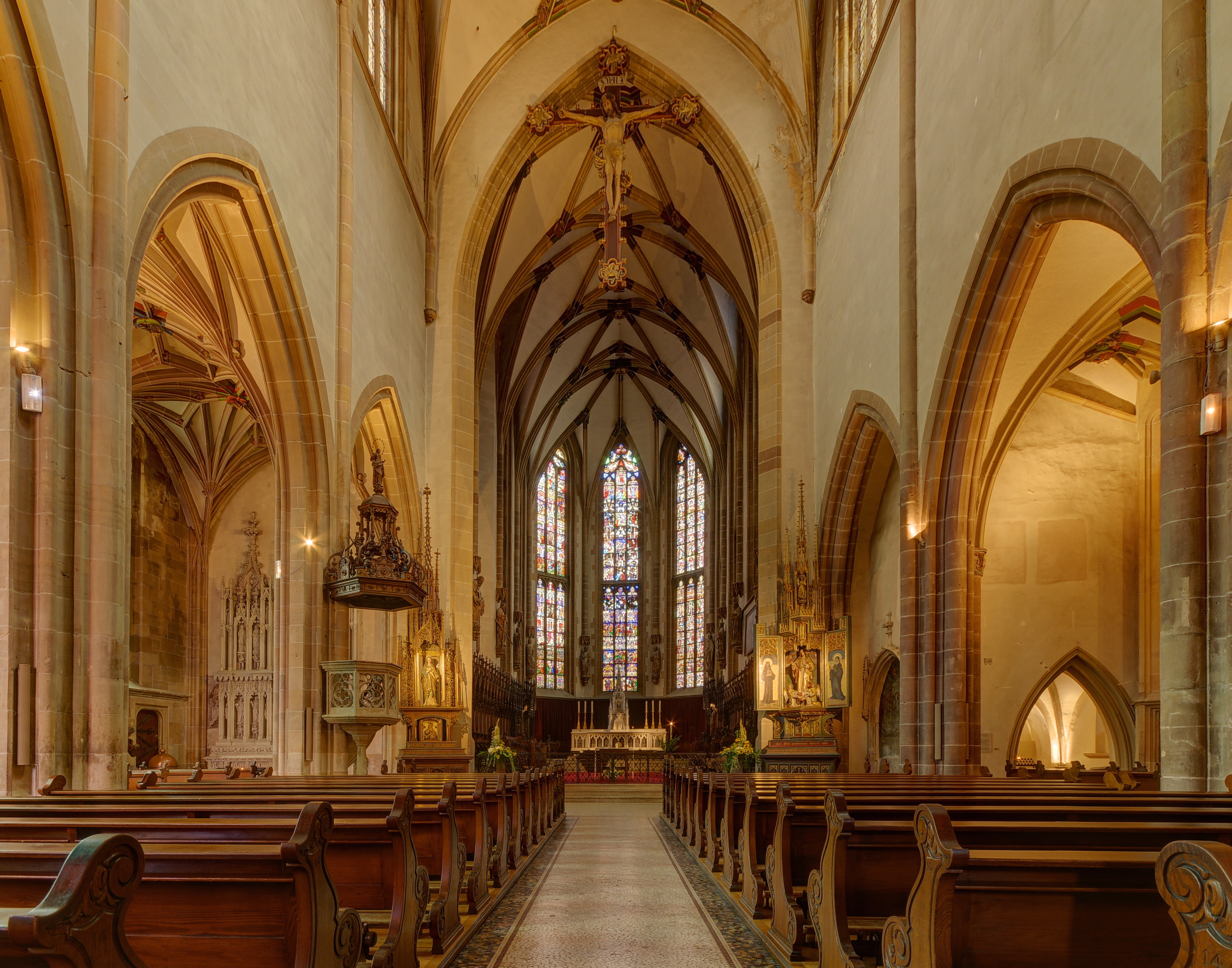
Inside: the central nave

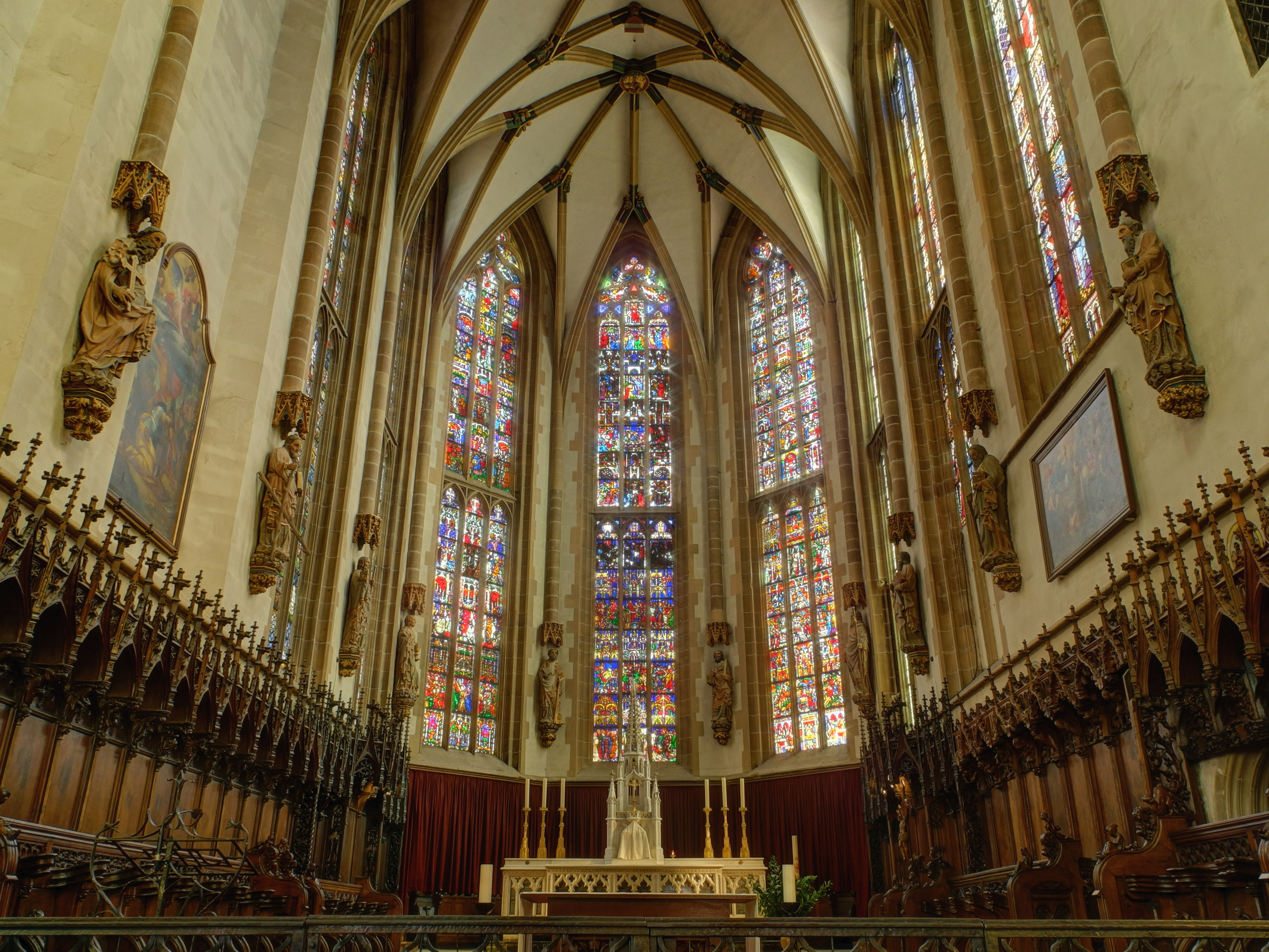
Inside : the choir

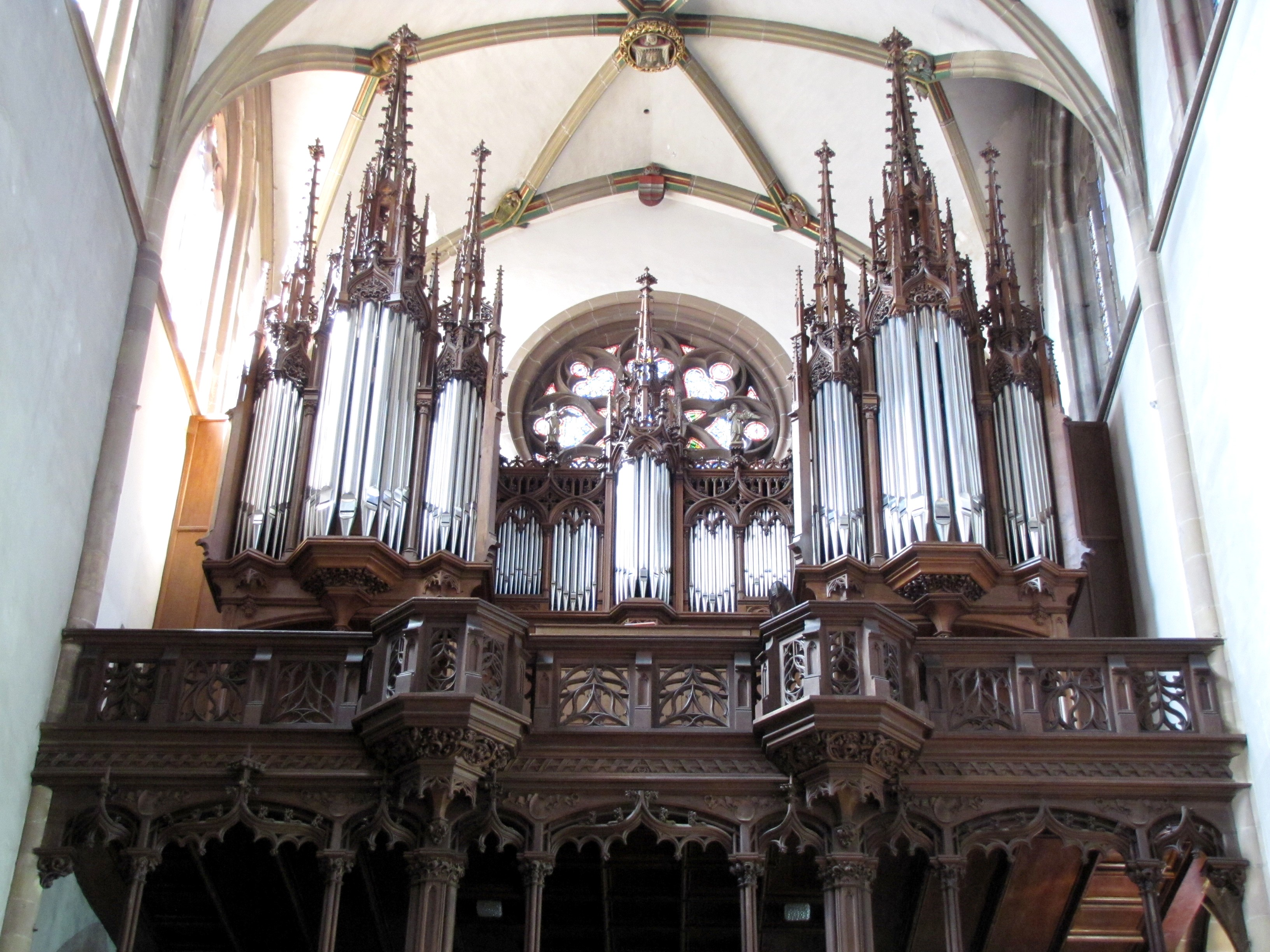
Inside: the pipe organ

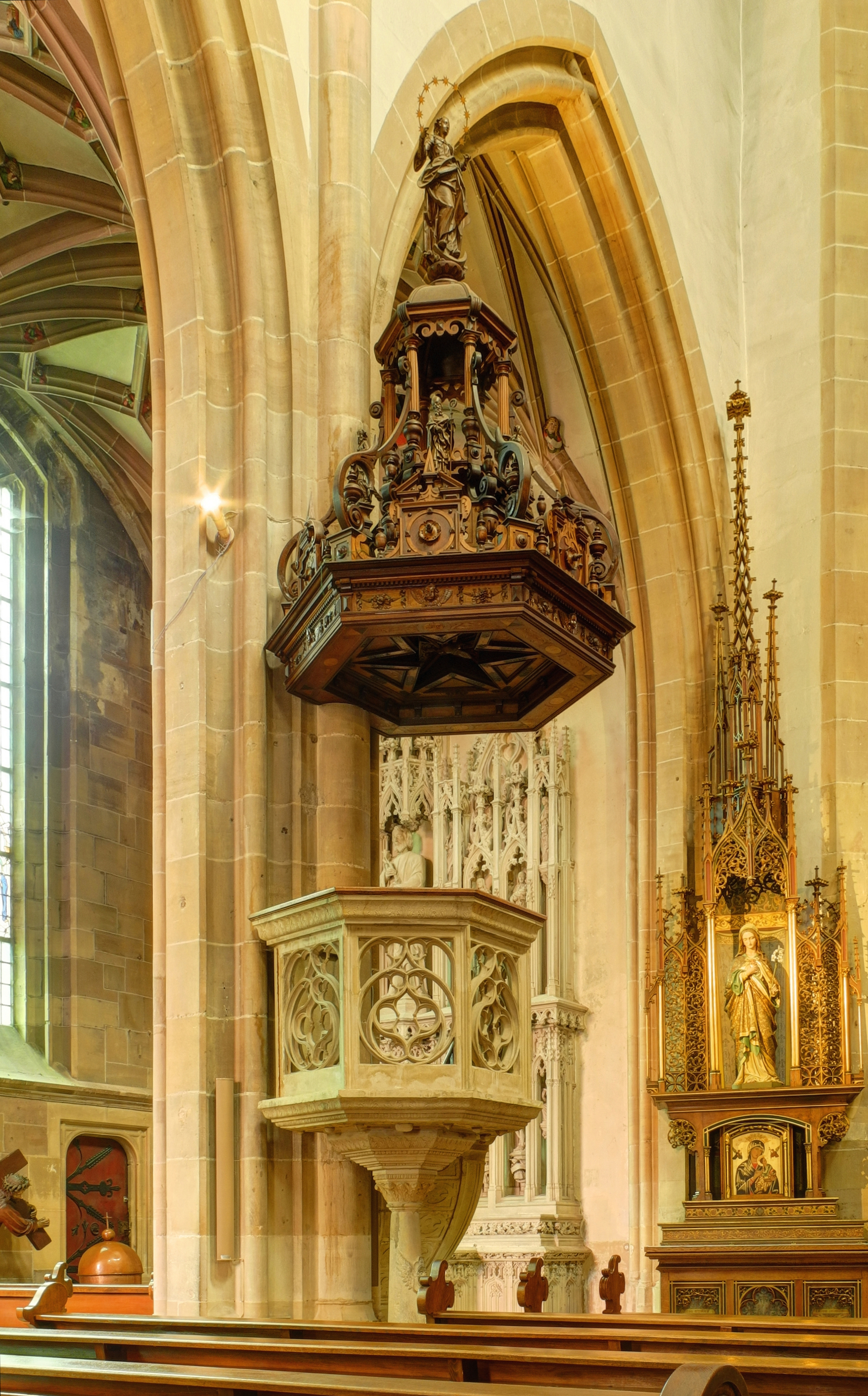
Inside: the pulpit

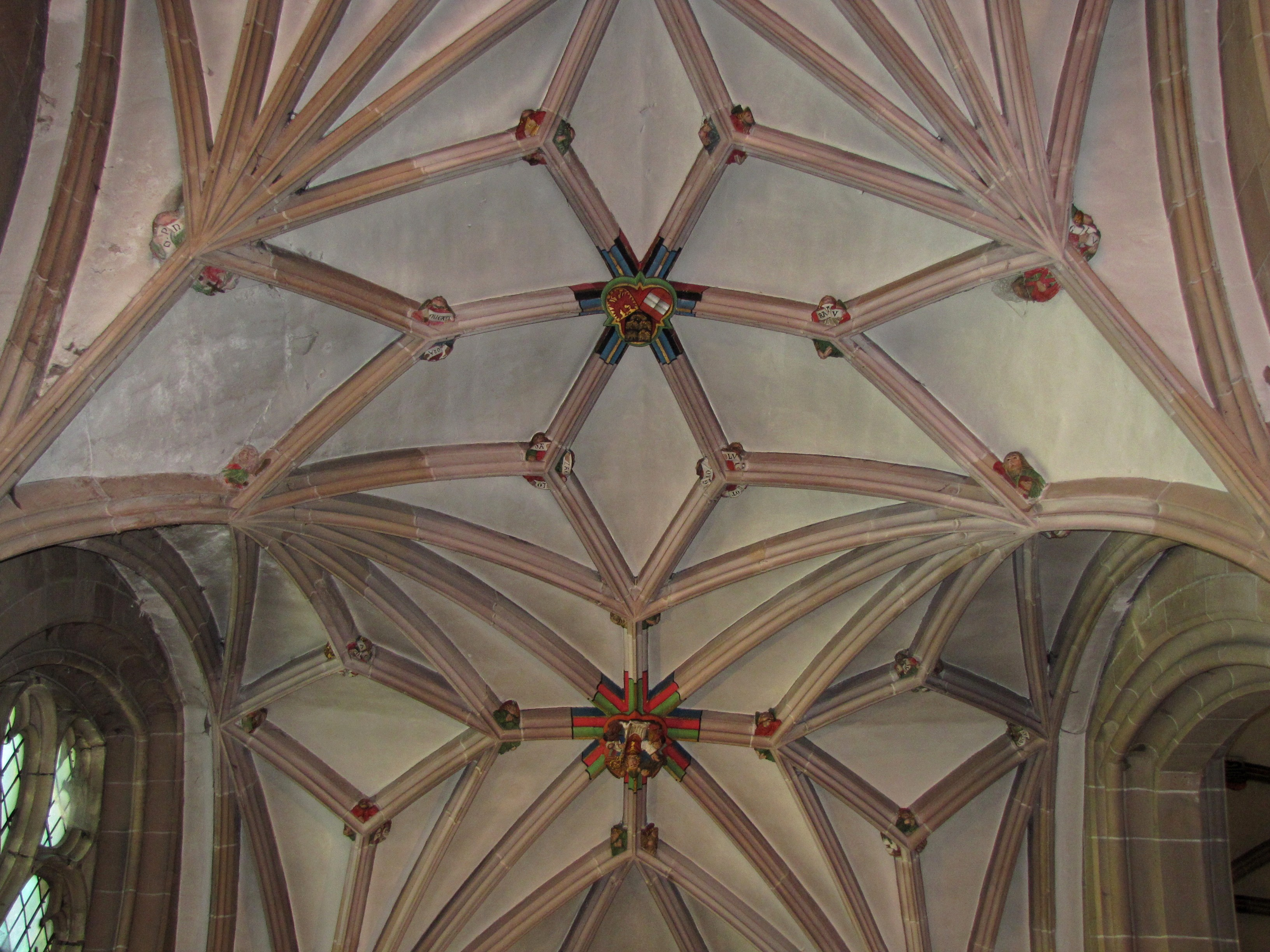
Inside : details of vaults

== See also ==
- Late medieval domes

== Literature ==
- René Kirner: La Collégiale Saint-Thiébaut de Thann, Imprimerie Lescuyer Lyon, 1st trimester 1990
