= Poor Man's Bible =

Art created to illustrate the teachings of the Bible

The term Poor Man's Bible has come into use in the modern era to describe works of art within churches and cathedrals which either individually or collectively have been created to illustrate the teachings of the Bible for a largely illiterate population. These artworks may take the form of carvings, paintings, mosaics or stained-glass windows. In some churches a single artwork, such as a stained-glass window, has the role of Poor Man's Bible, while in others, the entire church is decorated with a complex biblical narrative that unites in a single scheme.

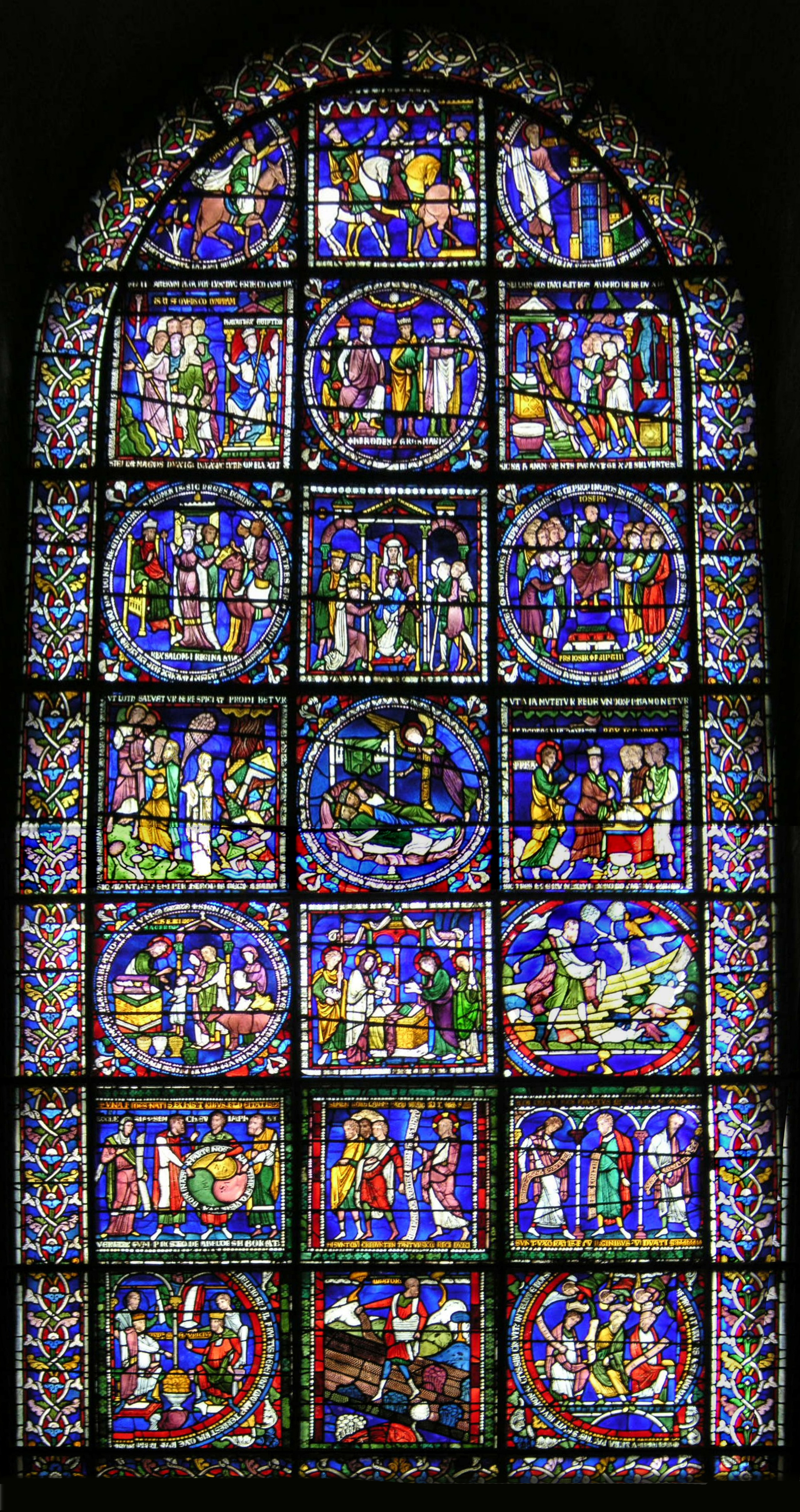
The Poor Man's Bible window at Canterbury Cathedral, 13th century, reconstructed with fragments of perhaps two other windows

== Sources ==
=== The Biblia pauperum ===
The term Poor Man's Bible is not to be confused with the so-called Biblia pauperum, which are biblical picture books, either in illuminated manuscript or printed "block-book" form. The illuminated Biblia Pauperum, despite the name given in the 1930s by German scholars, were much too expensive to have been owned by the poor, although the printed versions were much cheaper and many were probably shown to the poor for instruction.

But despite the fact that the books, at least in their earlier manuscript versions, were created for the rich, while the carvings and windows of a great church provided free entertainment and instruction to all who entered the doors, there were strong points of similarity in both subject matter and iconography.

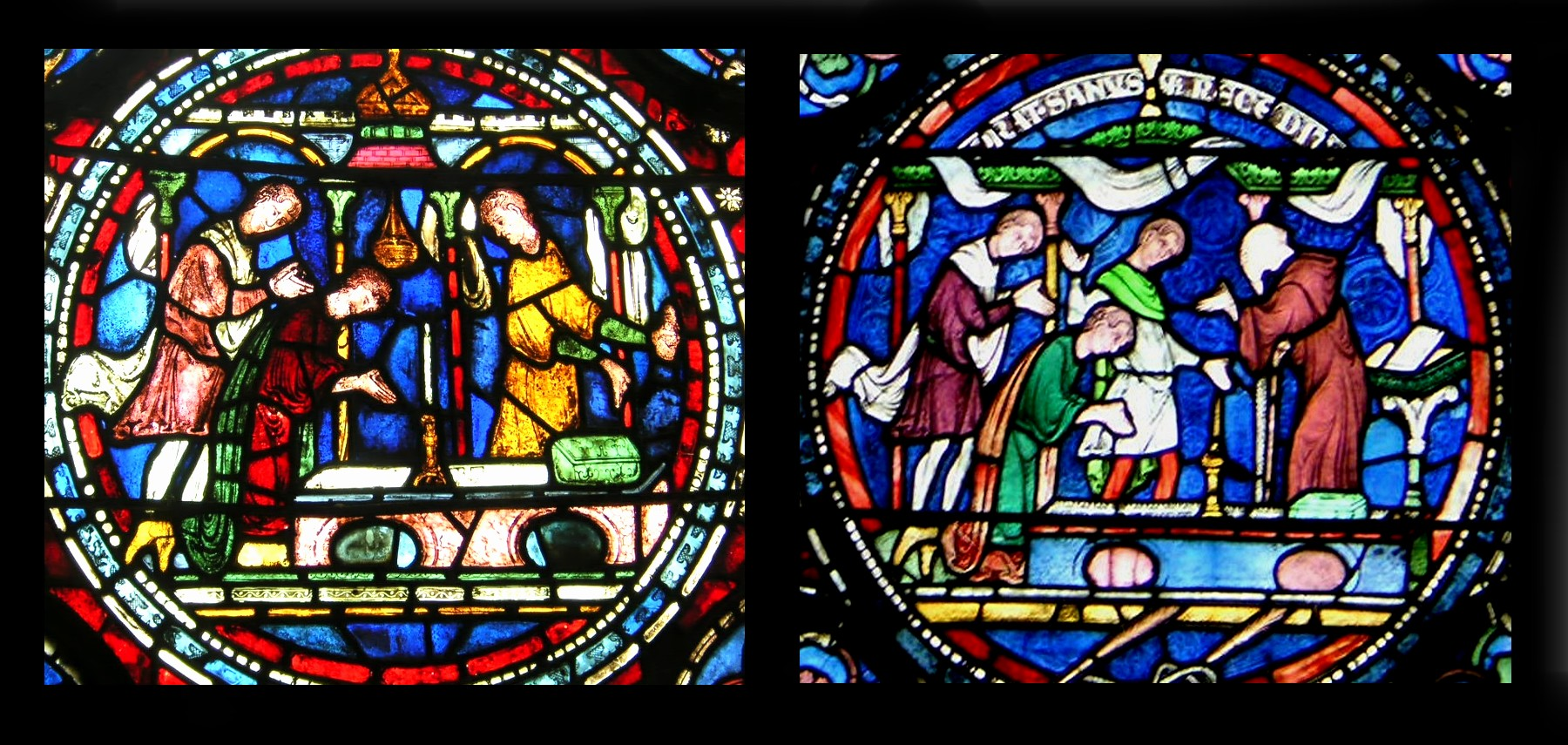
Details of two windows from Canterbury Cathedral illustrating different stories but repeating the two left-hand figures, the columns, table, candlestick and book. Left – Medieval; right – Victorian

=== Reproduction of motifs ===
In a world before the printed book, fidelity to the original in transcribing of books by hand was the only thing that maintained the Bible and other works of literature for posterity. Along with the written words of the document were often transcribed commentaries and illustrations. While talented illuminators added their own style and embellishments, the form of many pictures remained the same, and different scenes or motifs were repeated many times and in different media.

There is, for example a particular motif of several sheep, one of which has a foot raised to scratch its ear, which occurs in Italy in the 13th and 14th centuries in manuscript illumination, wall paintings and carved stone panels. A motif of paired flying winged figures which is seen on pagan Roman sarcophagi passed into Christian art as a very commonly used portrayal of angels. The reproduction of figures from manuscripts was particularly common in stained glass windows with various Biblia Pauperum being frequent sources.

=== Transfer of ideas ===
There exists a folio of drawings by Villard de Honnecourt from Picard in France, who between the years of about 1220 and 1230 travelled, for reasons unknown, in France and other parts of Europe as far as Hungary, producing drawings of motifs architectural, scientific and figural. The drawings, for the most part, are not original designs. They are drawn from buildings and artworks that he saw on his travels. In order that they might be utilized as designs for students, they were carefully annotated by a skilled calligrapher and placed into a leather portfolio. They give us a clear indication of the way in which decorative motifs and figurative subjects could be transferred from one region to another and from one artform to another.

Although the names of many masons, painters, illuminators and stained glass artists are unknown, the movements of some are traceable, including:

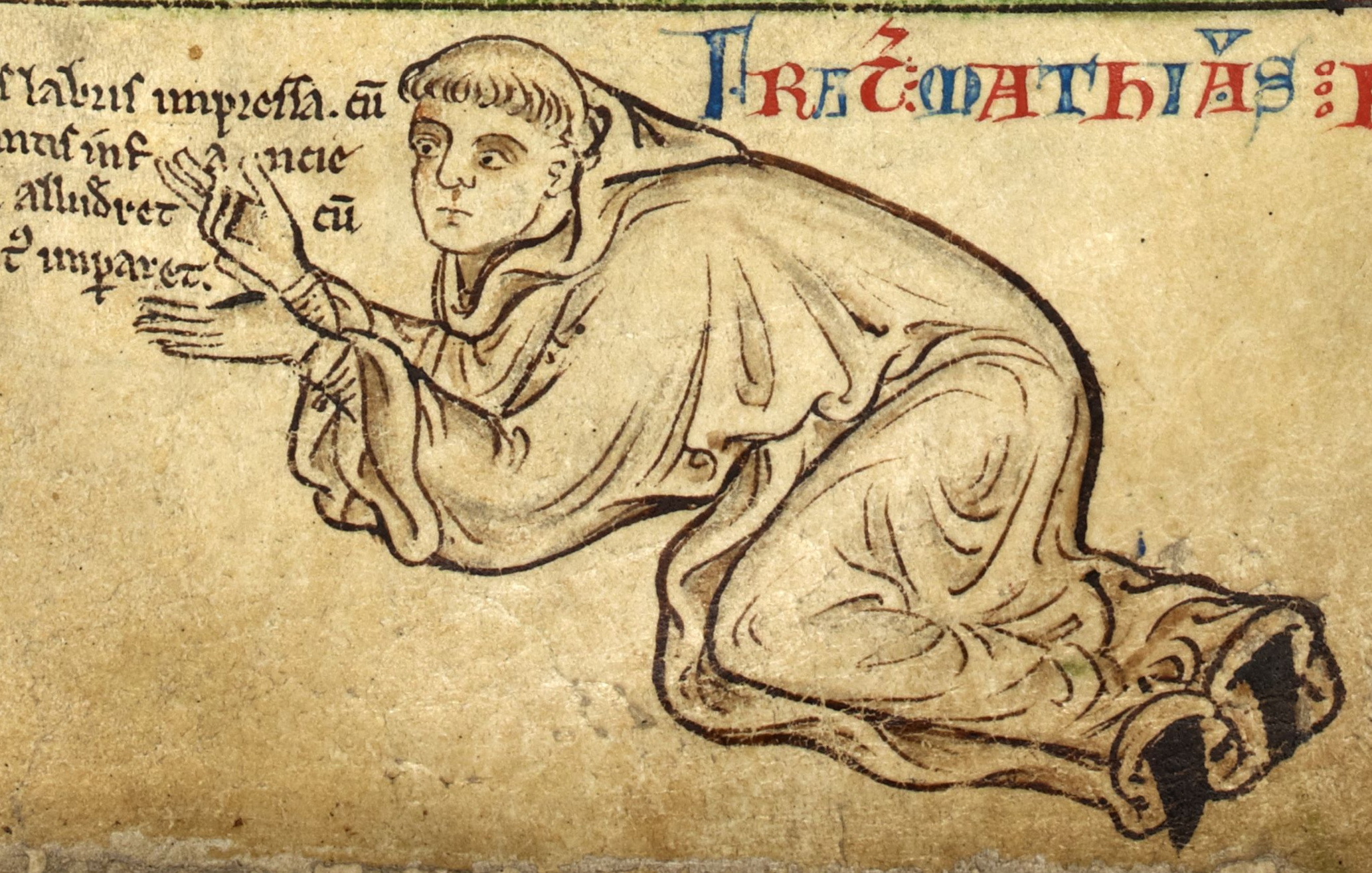
Self portrait of the Benedictine monk, Matthew Paris

- William of Sens, mason, was in Canterbury in 1174.
- Matthew Paris, Chronicler and illuminator, from St Albans, was in Trondheim in 1248.
- Pierre of Agincourt, mason, was in Naples in 1270
- Hugh Wilfred, from London, was in Avignon in 1321
- Mathieu d'Arras, mason, from Avignon, was in Prague in 1344
- Jan van Eyck, painter, from Maeseyck, was in Lisbon in 1428
- Juan de Colonia, mason, from Cologne, was in Burgos in 1442
- John Morow, mason, from Paris, was in Melrose in 1450
- Veit Stoss, sculptor, from Nuremberg, was in Cracow in 1477

== Theology ==
=== Revelations ===
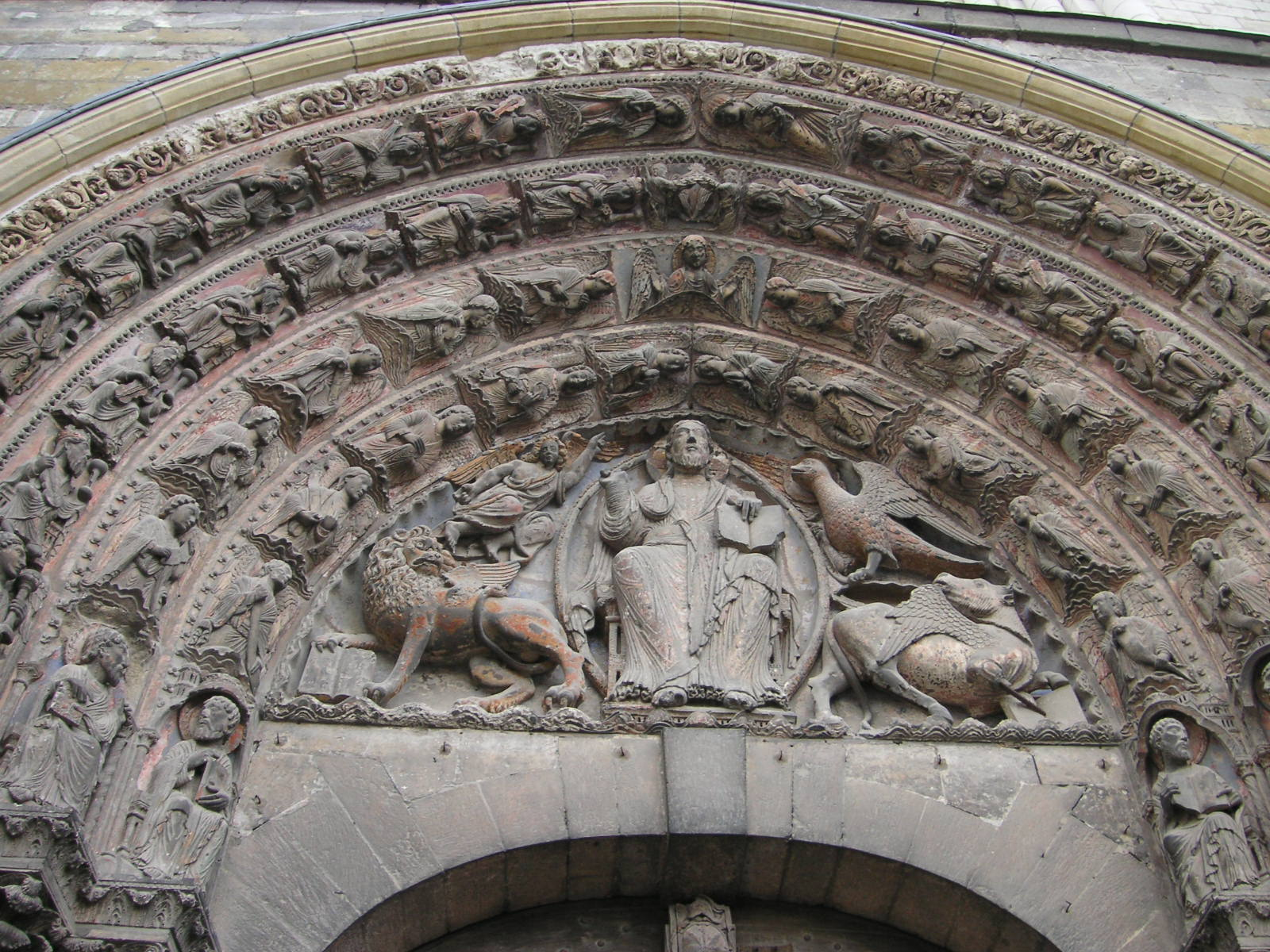
Revelation – Christ in Majesty from Angers Cathedral

One of the major purposes of an artistic scheme, or Poor Man's Bible, within a church was to show the viewer the "Way to Salvation". In order for this to be achieved, there are two major revelations by God to humankind that the viewer should be exposed to, by the means of the artistic scheme.

==== The message of sorrow, guilt and fear ====
For the Poor Man's Bible to fulfil its aim, the viewer needs to know and to accept the Christian premise that they are a sinful being and as such will be brought to trial on the Day of Judgement. This Day of Judgement is described by the last book of the Bible, known as the Revelation of St John or the Book of Revelation in which John describes many scenes, including the dreadful Apocalypse and a vision of the Lord seated on a throne borne up by four Heavenly Beasts: a winged lion, a winged man, a winged bull and an eagle, as also described in the Book of Ezekiel.

This Revelation is often depicted, with or without the Judgement and the rewards of Heaven and terrors of Hell, above the lintel of the main entrance door. In countries where stone-carving prevails as an art, it is externally placed. In countries where murals are more common, the Last Judgement occupies the internal wall above the main door.

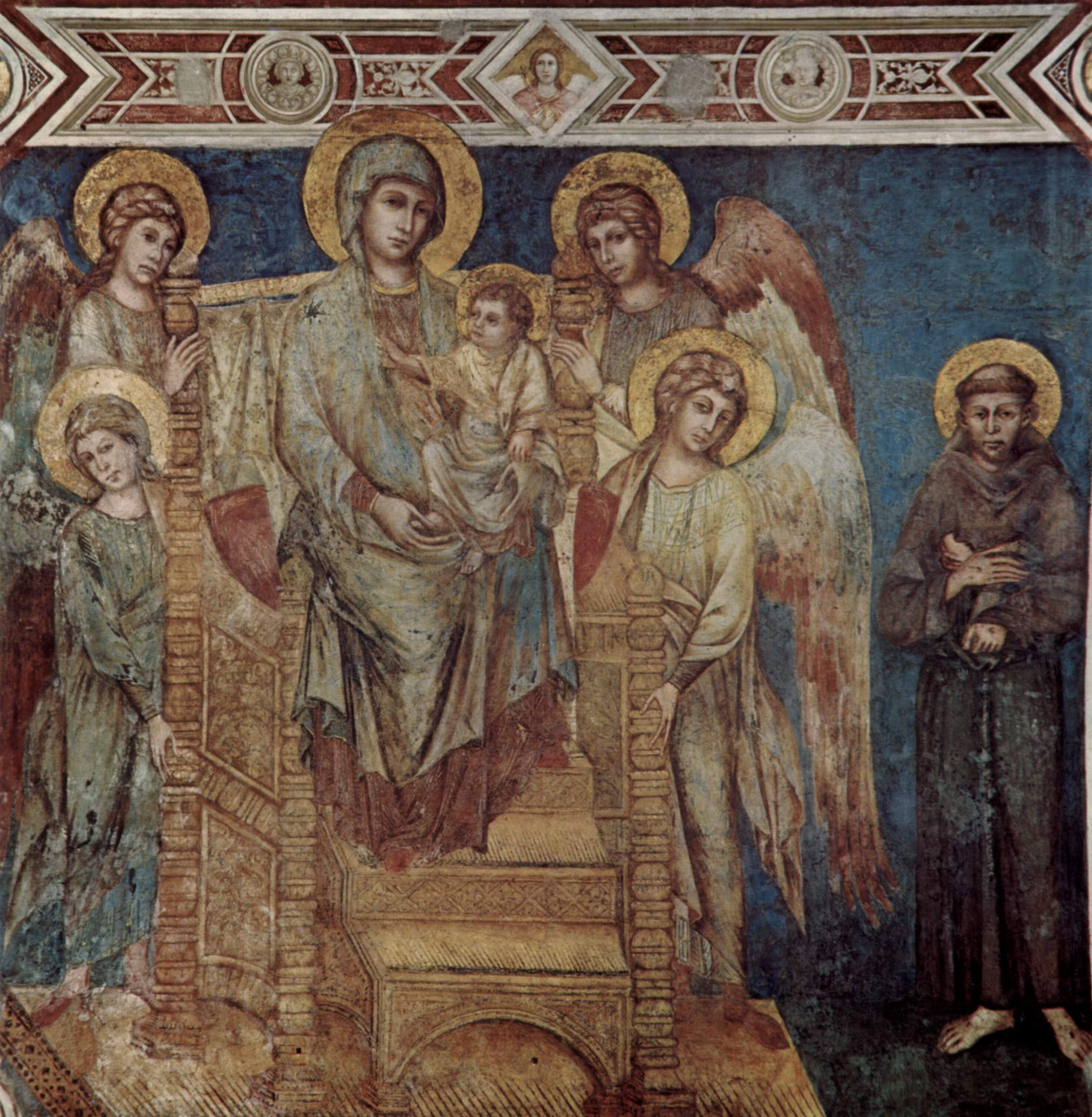
Redemption through Love – The Madonna and Child with St Francis, by Cimabue, in the Lower Church of St Francis at Assisi

==== The message of faith, hope and love ====
The second Revelation that the Poor Man's Bible seeks to share with the viewer is the revelation of God's plan for humanity's Salvation through sending his son, Jesus, to be born as a human baby, to live among people and to die a cruel death to absolve the sins committed by humanity. Jesus, as depicted on the walls, domes and windows of churches, is the Revelation of God's love, his grace, his mercy and his glory. This, broadly speaking, is the theme of every Poor Man's Bible.

The underlying theme of humankind's sinfulness may be illustrated in a number of ways. Although terrifying scenes of Christ the Judge were common in medieval art, they became less common in the art of the Renaissance. On the other hand, there were numerous depictions of the Genesis story of Adam and Eve eating the fruit that they had been forbidden by God to touch. There were also depictions of the so-called Seven Deadly Sins and the parable of the Wise and the Foolish Bridesmaids. All this sought to confirm humankind's need to turn to Jesus to receive God's saving grace.

The Revelation of God's grace through Jesus might be shown in several ways. The focus might be on his birth, on his sacrificial death, on his subsequent resurrection from the dead, or upon his coming in glory.

In other churches there is a focus upon an incident or incidents which particularly involve the saint to whom the church is dedicated. For example, a church dedicated to St Thomas might have above the high altar an oil painting in which Thomas sees the resurrected Jesus and proclaims him as Lord. A church dedicated to St Francis of Assisi might focus on the miraculous moment at which the saint, while praying before a large panel crucifix, heard the voice of God and received on his hands the signs of the wounds of Christ's crucifixion, the stigmata. (This crucifix before which St Francis prayed in the 12th century still exists.)

=== The Apostolic Succession ===
Part of the role of the decorated church was to confirm the role of the Church. Christ's Church was the body of Christian believers. But in the narrower sense it was an organization, and, particularly when under threat of heresy, humanism, division and reform, it needed to maintain and reinforce its role in offering the right way to Salvation.

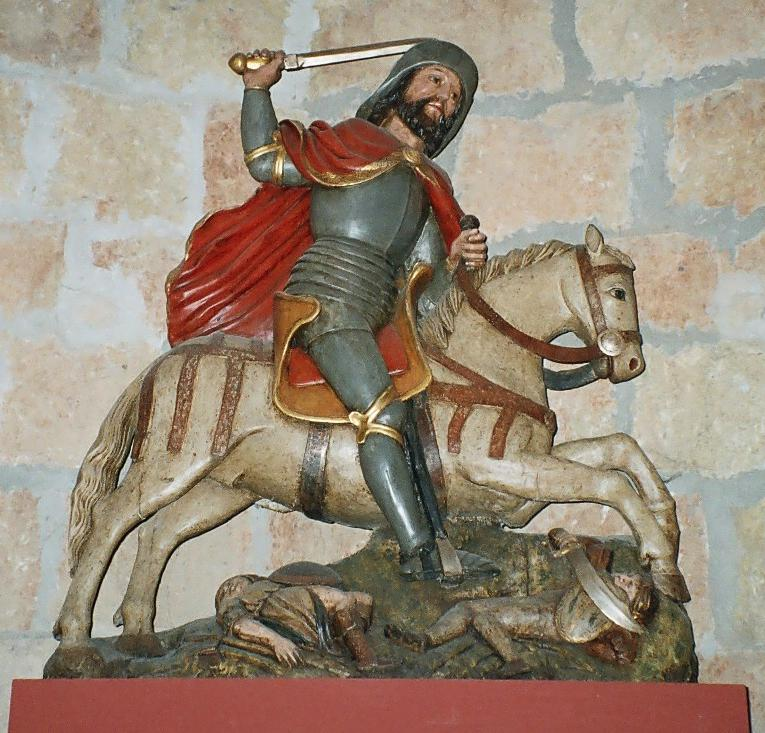
The Apostles – Painted wooden statue of St James who is said to have come to the aid of the Spanish against the Moorish invaders, now in a museum, Carrión de los Condes.

The decorative schemes in churches have often reflected the Church's role. One point of emphasis is to show that the Church was founded by the apostles and its history goes back to that time without a break. One way a church might reflect this was to have the relics of an apostle or an early martyr. There was a great trade in body parts of different religious notables. At least three churches claim to have the body of Mary Magdalene.

With the relics came beautiful reliquaries of ivory, gold and precious stones. Some saints' remains were reported to have healing powers. This fortunate phenomenon produced pilgrimage, which was very lucrative for the church involved and, if the saint was of sufficient renown, for all the churches and monasteries that sprang up along the pilgrimage route. Three of the most popular pilgrimage churches in the Middle Ages were the Church of the Holy Sepulchre in Jerusalem, the Cathedral of Santiago de Compostela in Spain and Canterbury Cathedral in Kent. Churches, particularly monasteries, honored their own. Thomas of Canterbury is an example. This archbishop was murdered by King Henry II's henchmen while praying at a side altar in the cathedral. The King himself made a penitent pilgrimage to the cathedral. Even though much of the stained glass has been lost over the years, there still remains two windows which show some of the many healings and miracles associated with St Thomas, both before and after his death.

In churches that are monastic, there is often an emphasis on the saints that belonged to that particular order. It is not uncommon to see religious paintings of the Blessed Virgin enthroned with the Christ Child and surrounded by numerous saints, including some of the 1st century, and some belonging to the particular Order who commissioned the work.

Another way for the church to confirm its role was through the administration of the rites. Some churches have decorative schemes which support this role of the church, illustrating the various rites and sacraments. The Church of St John at Tideswell in Derbyshire has a particularly fine set of 20th-century bench-ends by Advent and William Hunstone, showing the rites of Baptism, Confirmation and Ordination.

== Schemes ==
=== The Life of Jesus ===
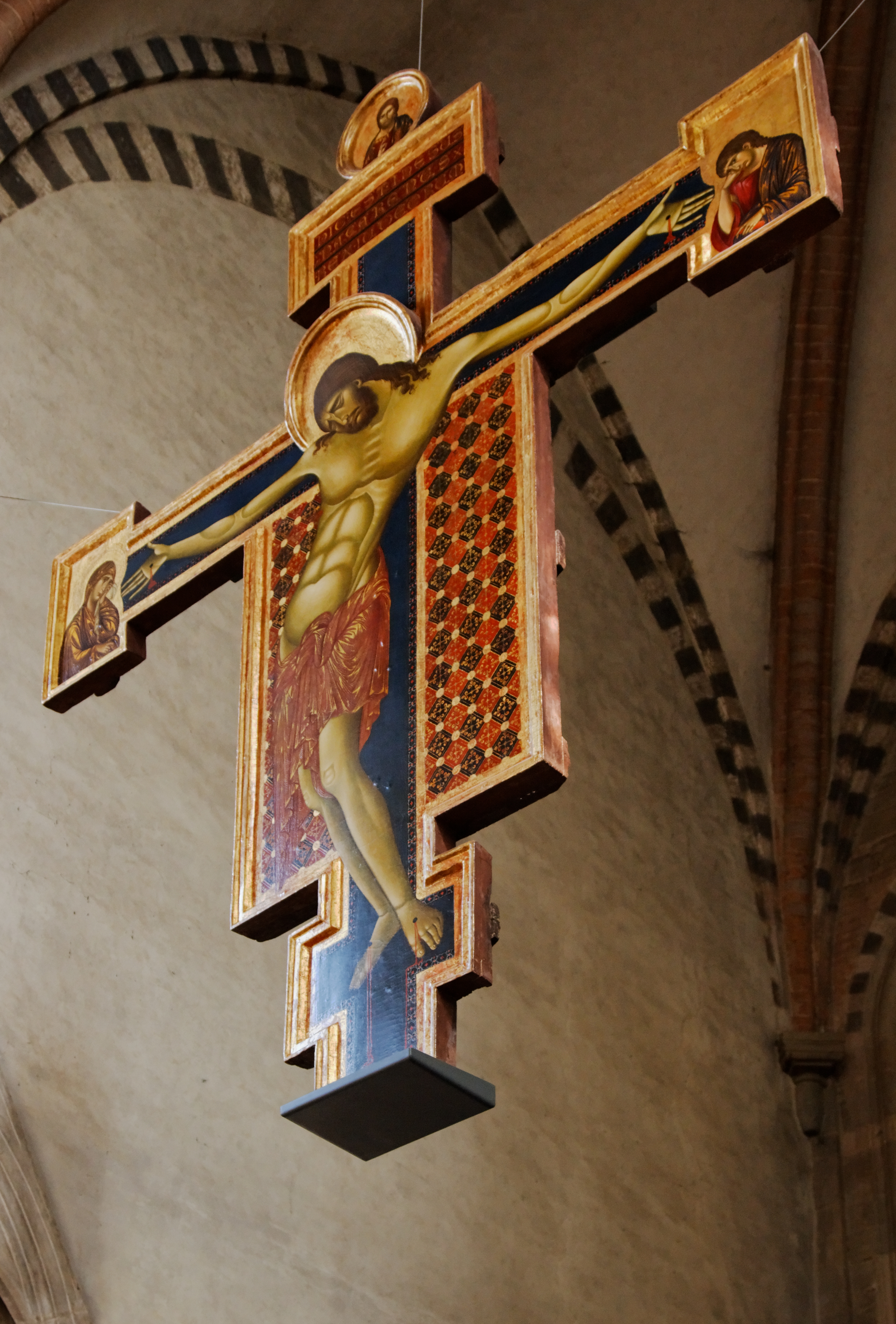
The Crucifix by Cimabue in San Domenico's Church, Arezzo, Italy

==== The Crucifix ====
The Crucifix is in general the most significant single narrative object in the decorative scheme of any church. During the medieval period the crucifix, called the Rood in England, from the Old Saxon roda, was a large crucifix placed conspicuously, often suspended in the Quire or standing on a screen separating either the Quire or the sanctuary from the rest of the church. The suspended crucifix could either be painted or carved of wood. In England where rood screens have often survived without the rood itself, it was general for the crucifix to have accompanying figures of Mary the Mother of Christ and either John the Evangelist or John the Baptist carrying a banner bearing the inscription "Behold, the Lamb of God". In Italy, roods were created by some of the most famous painters and sculptors, such as Giotto, Brunelleschi and Donatello. In many Protestant churches the crucifix has been replaced by a simple cross without a figure, symbolically representing both the redeeming sacrifice and the resurrection to new life offered by Jesus.

==== The Gospel ====
The most common theme for the Poor Man's Bible is the Life of Christ, the story of the Birth, Life, Passion, Death and Resurrection of Jesus. This may be related in a continuous sequence of pictures, either in paint, mosaic, wood sculpture or stained glass, and located either around the walls of a church or, particularly in French Cathedrals, in niches in a screen that surrounds the Sanctuary, so that they might be seen by people walking around the ambulatory.

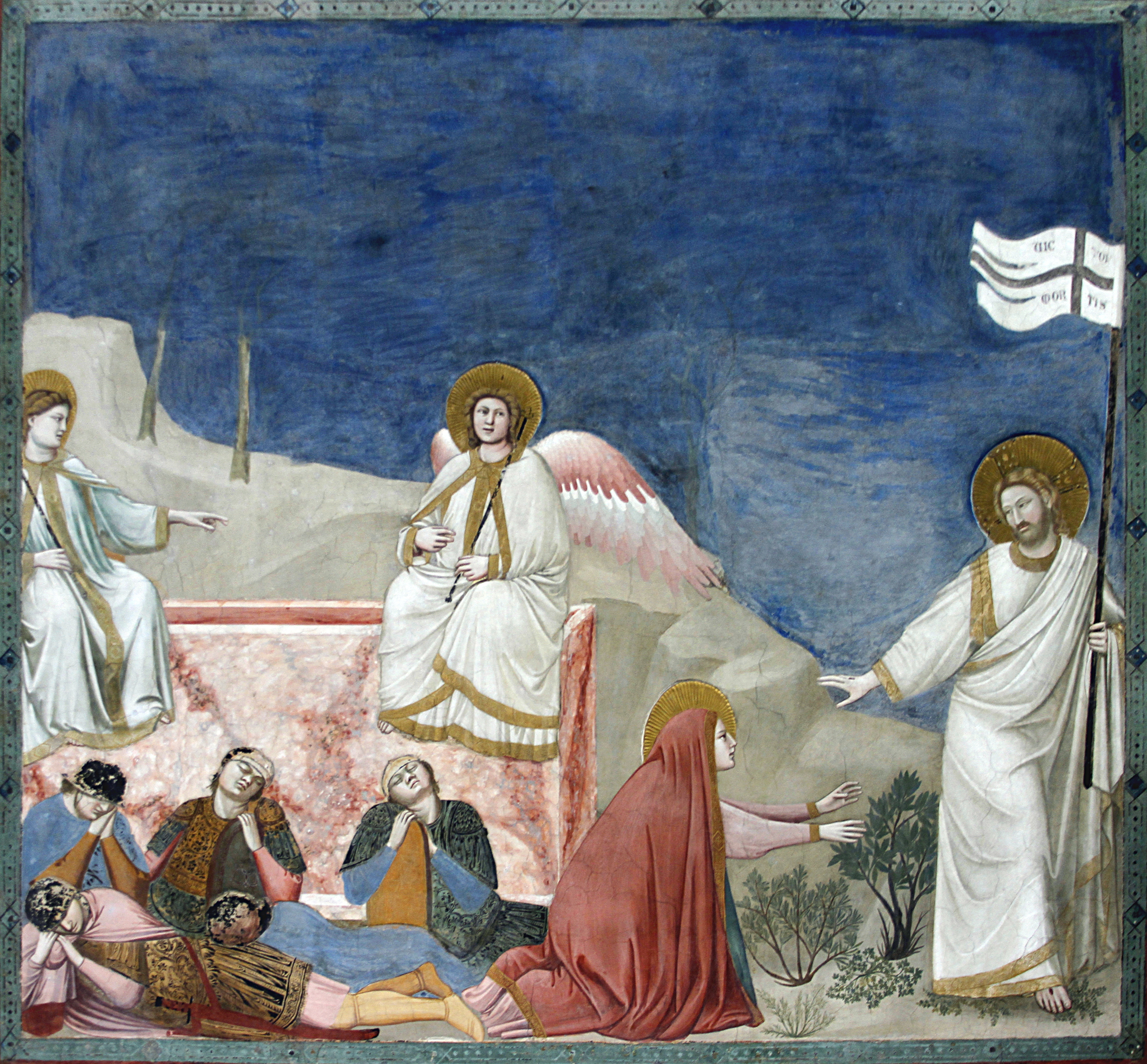
The Resurrection. Giotto di Bondone, Scrovegni Chapel, Padua. c.1305

Frequently only one aspect of Jesus' life is illustrated, most commonly his Death and Resurrection. But the theme may differ from church to church. A church located near a hospital might have windows that focus upon the miraculous healings. Another church might have aspects of Jesus' life that stress works of charity and service to others. These sorts of themes are particularly prevalent in 19th- and 20th-century churches.

==== Stations of the Cross ====
An important form of visual narration is the so-called Stations of the Cross cycle, telling of the Passion (trial and execution) of Jesus. These appear in almost all Roman Catholic churches and are used for devotional purposes as the prompts for a series of meditations and prayers. The Stations of the Cross usually take the form of oil paintings, molded and painted plaster or carved wood set into frames and suspended on the aisle walls so that the sequence may be easily followed.

=== The Life of the Virgin ===
Another form of biblical, and occasionally extra-canonical, narrative that is often illustrated is the Life of the Virgin, in earlier periods concentrating on her early life using additional apocryphal scenes drawn from books such as the "Infancy Gospel of James", written about the middle of the 2nd century CE. Cycles of Mary usually take the story up to the Birth of Christ, often including the visit of the Magi and the Flight to Egypt, and later usually cover later scenes from the life of Mary, especially her presence at the Crucifixion, Pentecost and her death, known as the Death of the Virgin, for which depictions of the Assumption of Mary began to be substituted from the late Middle Ages.

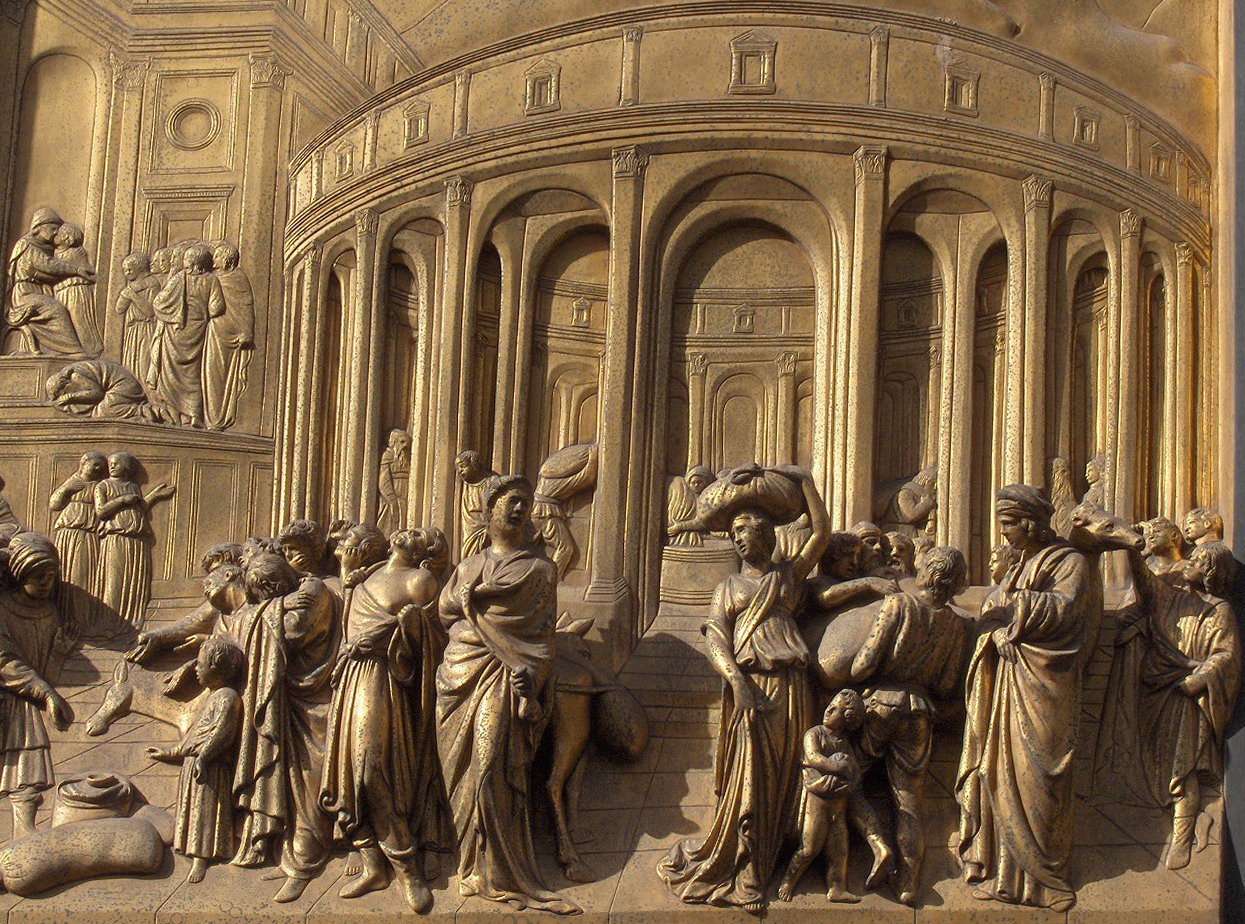
Old Testament – Joseph in Egypt from the "Gates of Paradise", Lorenzo Ghiberti

=== The Old Testament ===
The aspect of the Old Testament that appears most frequently in a continuous narrative form is the Creation and the Downfall of humankind through the actions of Adam and Eve. Surviving large-scale extensive schemes of Old Testament stories are comparatively rare. The oldest is in mosaics of the 5th century in the Basilica di Santa Maria Maggiore in Rome. There are two complete frescoed schemes in Italy, one painted by Giusto de Menabuoi in the Baptistery of the Cathedral of Padua in the 14th century and another of about the same date by Bartolo di Fredi in the Collegiate Church in San Gimignano. There are some surviving schemes in stained glass, including that in the Sainte-Chapelle in Paris. By far the best known of such schemes are the one painted by Michelangelo on the Sistine Chapel ceiling and that created in bronze for the doors of the Baptistery of Florence by Lorenzo Ghiberti, the so-called "Gates of Paradise". Many more schemes survive in similar small-scale carvings on portals or doors.

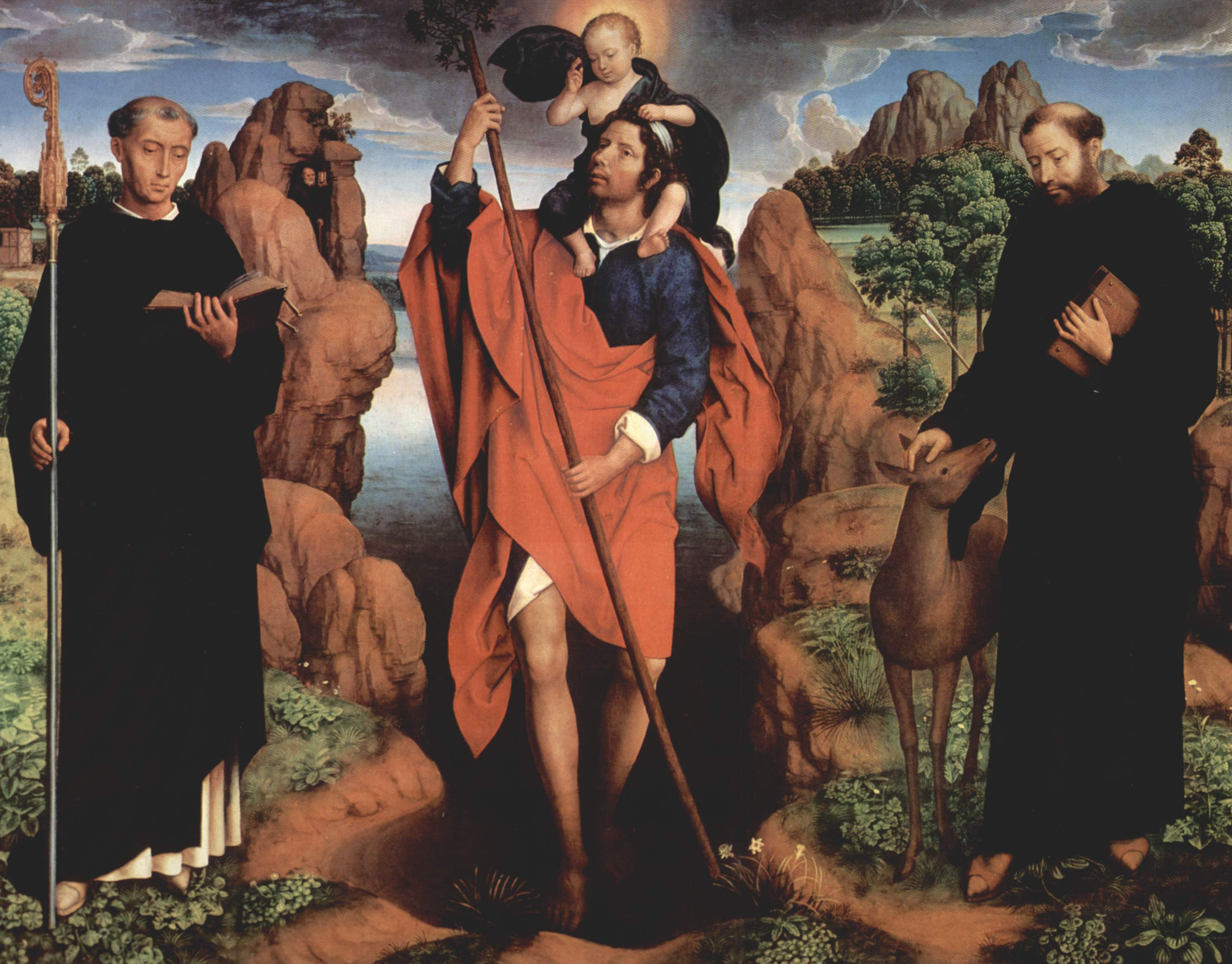
Lives of the Saints – St Christopher with St Maurus of Glanfeuil and St Giles, Memling, 1484

=== Lives of the Saints ===
Many churches and cathedrals are dedicated to a particular biblical or early Christian saint and bear the name of that saint. Other churches have been founded by or have been associated with some person who was later canonized. These associations are often celebrated in the decoration of the church, to encourage worshippers to emulate the piety, good works, or steadfast faith of the saint. Sometimes saints are shown together in a sort of pictorial gallery, but the depiction of narratives is also common. This may take the form of a single incident, such as Saint Sebastian tied to a tree and bristling with arrows or St Christopher carrying the Christ Child across the river, or the saint's life may be shown in a narrative sequence, similar to the way in which the life of Jesus is depicted, such as the Life of St Augustine by Benozzo Gozzoli in the Church of Sant' Agostino, San Gimignano.

The stories of a saint's life may be based on highly reliable sources. On the other hand, some may contain fanciful elements and others may be entirely fictitious. Some of the stories are well known and the saints that they depict are easily recognized. These include St Joan of Arc, St Stephen the first Christian martyr and St Francis of Assisi preaching to the birds. There are many other saints whose recognition is highly localized. Among these is Santa Fina of San Gimignano, whose death and funeral were depicted in two frescoes by Domenico Ghirlandaio.

=== Prophets, apostles and patriarchs ===
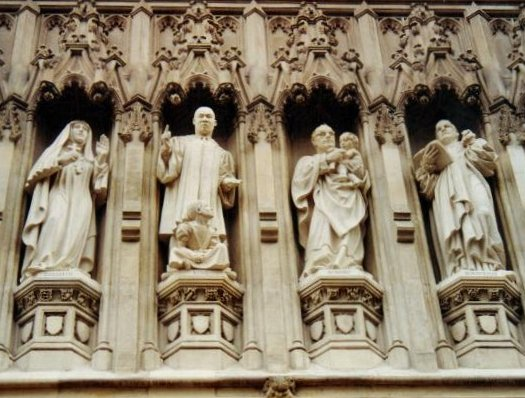
20th-century martyrs, Westminster Abbey, Mother Elizabeth of Russia, Revd Martin Luther King Jr., Archbishop Óscar Romero, Pastor Dietrich Bonhoeffer

The depiction of prophets, apostles, saints, patriarchs and other people associated with the church often have a place in the decorative scheme. The thematic use of such figures may be a very obvious one. There may, for example, be a row of stained glass windows showing the prophets that predicted the coming of the Messiah. Or within a carved stone screen might stand statues of those monarchs who were particularly devoted to the church. The apostles, usually twelve in number but sometimes accompanied by St Paul, John the Baptist, Mary Magdalene and others, are a frequent subject. The upright, standing figures particularly lent themselves to architectural decoration and they often appear in a columnar form around doorways or in tiers on the façades of cathedrals.

Sometimes the selection is esoteric, the choice depending on the local tradition of the church or whim of the individual who commissioned the particular work of art. Sometimes the characters depicted are easily identified because they carry particular attributes or emblems: John the Baptist has a reed cross and banner and may wear a camel-skin, Mary Magdalene has an ointment pot, Peter carries the keys of Heaven, St Agatha has her breasts on a salver. Martyrs frequently carry a palm leaf or the instrument of their death. St Denis of Paris carries his own head, with which he is claimed to have walked all around the town.

List of common subjects

- The Ancestors of Christ
- The Prophets of Israel
- The Twelve Apostles
- The Four Evangelists
- The Doctors of the Church
- Martyred saints
- Saints of a particular region
- Saints of a particular religious order
- Devout rulers

=== The Reference Bible ===
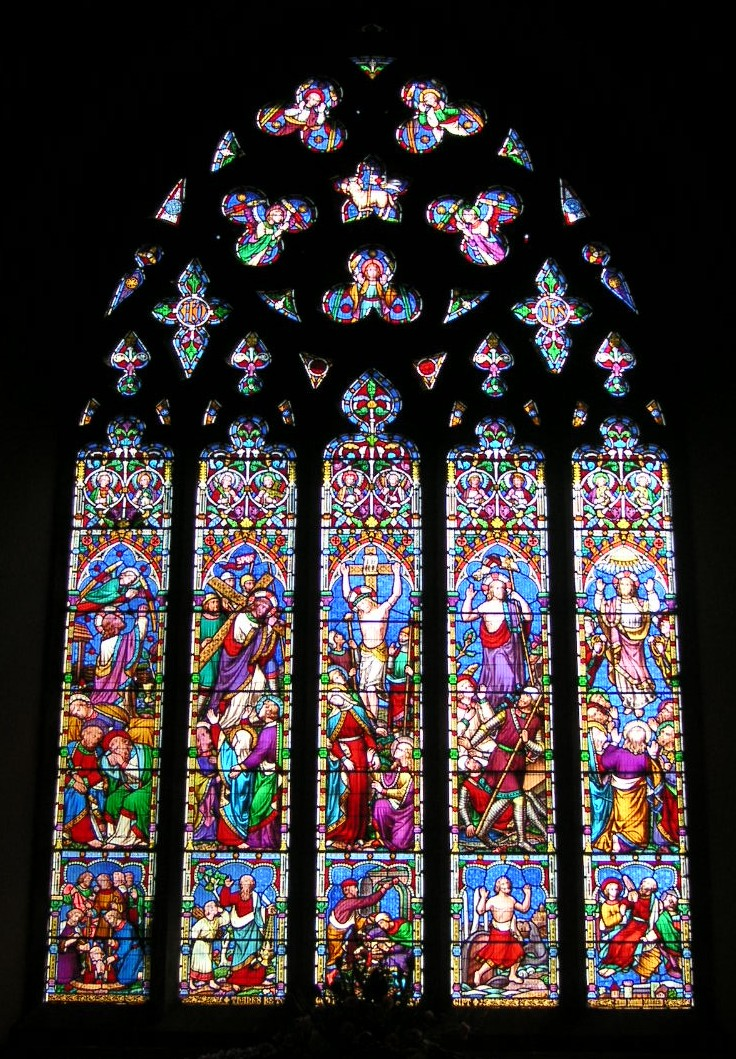
Cross references – The East Window of St Mary's Chilham, UK. The five scenes of the Death and Resurrection of Jesus are paired with Old Testament scenes which prefigure these events. nineteenth century

In many of the decorative schemes that illustrate the life of Jesus, the narrative is set into the context of related stories drawn from the Old Testament and sometimes from the Acts of the Apostles. Certain characters of the Old Testament, through particular incidents in their lives, are seen to prefigure Jesus in different ways. Often their actions or temperament is set in contrast to that of Jesus. For example, according to the Bible, Adam, created in purity and innocence by God, fell to temptation and led humankind into sin. Jesus, on the other hand, lived a blameless life and died for the redemption of the sin of Adam and all his descendants.

The way in which the cross-referencing is achieved is usually by a simple juxtaposition, particularly in mediaeval stained glass windows, where the narrative of Jesus occupies the central panels of a window and on either side are the related incidents from the Old Testament or Acts. In this, the windows have much in common with the Biblia Pauperum which were often arranged in this manner, and were sometimes used as a source of design. In nineteenth- and early twentieth-century windows, the sections holding the major narrative are often larger and the Old Testament panels might be quite small. A similar arrangement is sometimes used in Early Renaissance panel painting.

The nineteenth-century east window by William Wailes at Chilham, Kent, demonstrates a typical pairing of scenes such as had occurred from the medieval period.

- Jesus, in a state of agony of mind, prays in the Garden of Gethsemane. He asks his disciples Peter, James and John to wait nearby, but they fall asleep, thus "abandoning" him. Below: Joseph the Dreamer is put down a well by his own brothers and abandoned.
- Jesus is made to carry his cross on the way to the execution place of Golgotha. Below: Isaac, led by his father Abraham, carries the firewood, not knowing that his father plans to sacrifice him.
- Jesus is crucified. Below: The Israelites at the Passover slay a sacrificial lamb and paint its blood on the door lintel as a sign to the angel of the Lord.
- Jesus is resurrected from the dead. Below: Jonah is spat out by a great fish which had swallowed him three days earlier.
- Jesus ascends to Heaven. Below: Elijah is carried up to Heaven by angels.

In some of the most sophisticated schemes, there is not only a reference to events of the Old Testament, but also a cross-referencing of New Testament events. One such scheme is that painted by Giotto in Padua at the Scrovegni Chapel. At first appearance, the frescoed scenes of the birth and childhood of the Virgin and the life of Jesus seem simply to proceed around the walls in tiers, in a predictable sequence, with small painted panels of Old Testament motifs (rather than detailed scenes) between them. Close examination shows a rich contextuality. Scenes have been skillfully placed so that they contrast with or inform upon another, either placed in the same vertical row, or in immediate opposition across the building. Such juxtapositions include the wise men kneeling before the Infant Christ with Jesus washing the feet of Peter kneeling before the apostle Peter washing his feet and the Raising of Lazarus from the Dead with the Resurrection of Christ.

== Cycles ==
=== The round world ===
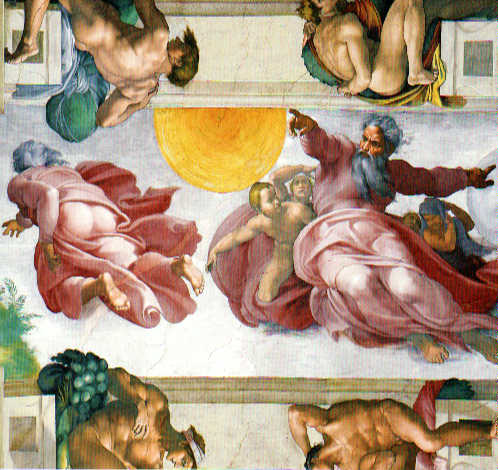
The Creation of the Sun, Moon and Vegetation, Michelangelo, from the Ceiling of the Sistine Chapel.

A common theme in the art of many churches is to show the greatness of God through his creation and the order that he has placed upon it. God is often depicted in the act of creation as described in Genesis– making the firmament (or Earth), placing the Sun, stars and Moon in the sky or creating mankind. There are many symbolic representations of the Earth, sometimes showing the four rivers that are described in Genesis as running out of Eden. In Baroque art, the globe is often represented, with varying degrees of accuracy. Just as Genesis named four rivers that divided the ancient world, there were four writers upon whose books the Christian Church rested. Convention provided four compass points, four winds, four elements of fire, air, earth and water and four humors affecting the human nature. The number four appeared to be part of the way in which God organized his world. It related to the fact that creatures have four limbs and buildings stand firm on four supports. Consequently, groups of four people or objects are common in Christian art, demonstrating that the Church is directly linked to the order of material and earthly things that God has put in place.

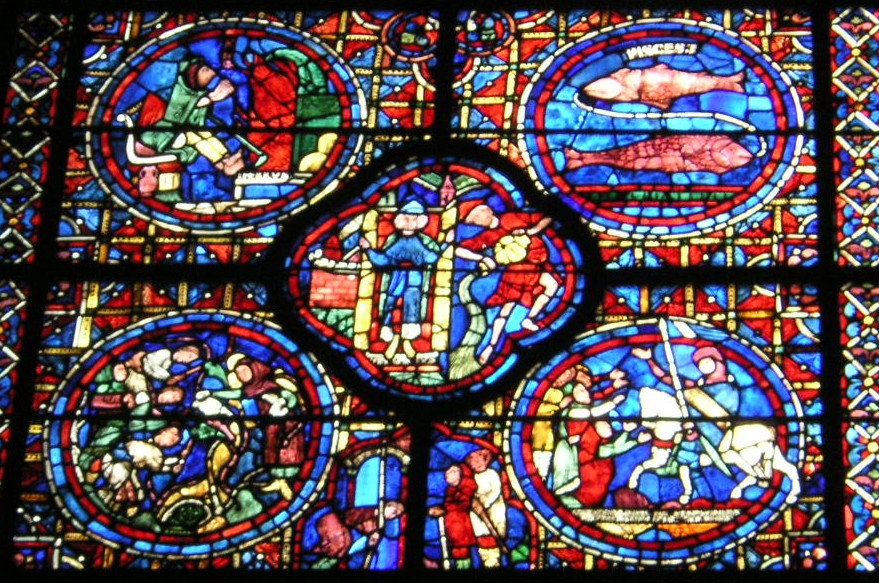
God's Order of the Universe in the Window of the Months, Chartres Cathedral. December, January and February

=== The round year ===
Linked to the theme of God's creation is God's Order. The God of Genesis, who put the sun to brighten the day and the moon for the night also caused the stars to shift overhead in a particular pattern which coincided with the changing seasons and could be seen as God's guidance as to when sowing and harvesting was to take place. The ancient identities of the Zodiacal signs continued in use and were often depicted in small carvings, particularly around arched doorways, and also in stained glass where, because the pattern is cyclic, they were particularly suited to small panels in rose windows.

The Zodiac was intrinsically linked with the so-called Labours of the Months, the various tasks and activities that were performed at certain months of the year, the tending and harvesting, the hunting and feasting, and the sitting by the fire in the long cold month of February. As most people lived in rural communities, the tasks that decked the arches and windows of the churches were all too familiar.

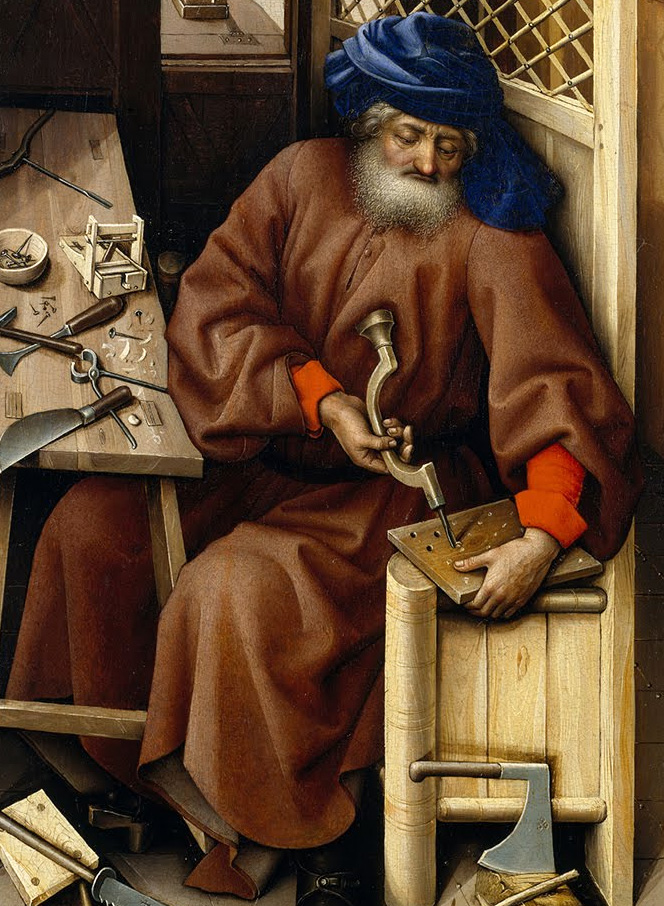
St Joseph the Carpenter from a triptych by the Master of Flemalle, 1425.

=== God's gifts ===
God, who according to Genesis, made the Heaven and the Earth, also created man in his own likeness and gave to humankind also the gift of creativity. It is a lesser theme that consistently runs through religious art. There are, in particular, and understandably, many depictions of stonemasons, woodcarvers, painters and glaziers at work. There are also countless depictions of monks, musicians and scribes. As well as these are shown spinners and weavers, merchants, cooks, carters, butchers, apothecaries, furriers, bullock drivers, fishermen and shepherds.

In general, these depictions of human living are not among those elements of decoration that could be termed Fine Arts. They occupy, for the most part, places of less distinction and frequently may not be very well known. They hide in the leaves of the capitals of columns and the bosses of roofs. They form small panels on the exterior of buildings or are carved in wood beneath the folding seats of the quire.

On the other hand, where artworks have been sponsored by major guilds, they may be masterpieces by renowned artists, such as the series of statues of Patron Saints that fill the external niches of the Church of Orsanmichele in Florence, of which Donatello's St George, commissioned by the armorers and now in the Bargello, is one of the best known statues of the Early Renaissance. These saints include among their number a blacksmith, a professional soldier, a doctor, a tax collector and four shoemakers.

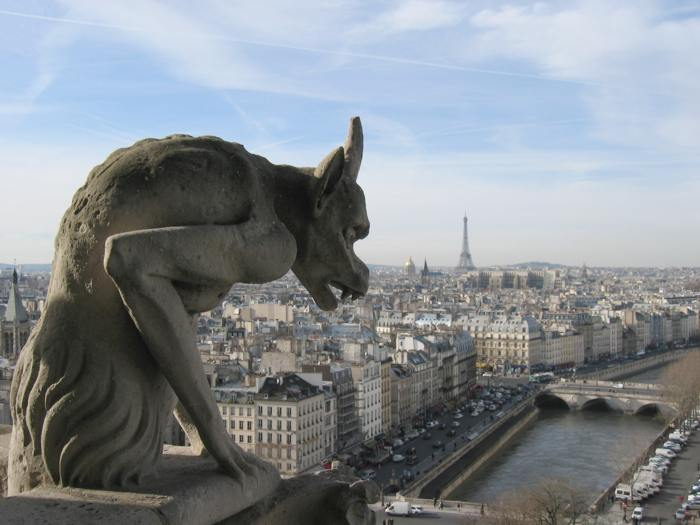
A Gargoyle of Notre Dame Cathedral, Paris.

=== Gryphons, gargoyles, beasts and cherubs ===
Cathedrals are decorated with a wide variety of creatures and characters, many of which have no obvious link to Christianity. Often the creature was seen to represent some particular vice or virtue or was believed to have a certain characteristic which could serve as a warning or as an example to the Christian believer. "Sins of the Flesh" were often represented by human figures poking out their tongues, stroking their beards, displaying their genitals or gorging on food.

Other motifs represent the Nature of Christ, or the nature of the Church. One such is that of the pelican. It was believed that a pelican was prepared to peck its own breast in order to feed its hungry young. Thus, the pelican became a symbol for the love of Christ for the Church.

Creatures such as hares, geese, monkeys, foxes, lions, camels, gryphons, unicorns, bees, and storks abound in the decorative carvings of capitals, wall arcading, ceiling bosses and the wooden fittings of cathedrals. Some, like the Gargoyles of Notre Dame, are well known to many. Others, like the Blemyah and Green Man of Ripon Cathedral in England, lurk underneath the folding seats or misericords of the Quire.

== Typologies ==
Moldoviţa Monastery, Romania

=== Mural ===
A mural is a painting on the surface of a plastered wall, the term coming from the Latin muralis. It is cheap compared with mosaic and stained glass, and can be extremely durable under good conditions, but liable to be damaged by damp and stained by candle smoke. Narrative murals are generally located on the upper walls of churches, while the lower walls may be painted to look like marble or drapery. They also occur on arches, vaulted roofs and domes.

Murals were a common form of wall decoration in ancient Rome. The earliest Christian mural paintings come from the catacombs of Rome. They include many representations of Christ as the Good Shepherd, generally as a standardized image of a young, beardless man with a sheep on his shoulders. Other popular subjects include the Madonna and Child, Jonah being thrown into the sea, the three young men in the furnace and the Last Supper. In one remarkable mural, in the Catacomb of the Aurelii, is the earliest image of Jesus, as he came to be commonly depicted, as a bearded, Jewish man in long robes. In this particular image he is preaching, not to a group of people but to a flock of sheep and goats, representing the faithful and the wayward.

Mural painting was to become a common form of enlightening decoration in Christian churches. Biblical themes rendered in mural can be found all over the Christian world. They are a more common form of church decoration in some regions than others. Painted churches are common throughout those areas where the Eastern Orthodox Church prevails. In Romania there is an unusual group of churches in which it is the exterior rather than the interior which is richly decorated, the large arcaded porches containing images of the Last Judgement.

Mural painting was also common in Italy, where the method employed was generally fresco, painting on freshly laid, slightly damp plaster. Many fine examples have survived from the Medieval and Early Renaissance periods. Remarkably, the best known example of such Biblical story-telling was not created for the edification of the poor but for the rich and powerful, the Ceiling of the Sistine Chapel created by Michelangelo for Pope Julius II.

Murals occur in France, particularly in the south where the walls tend to be wider, rather than the north where the art of stained glass prevailed. In England, few examples survived the depredations of the Reformation. Some fine Early Medieval examples exist in Germany and Spain.

=== Mosaic ===
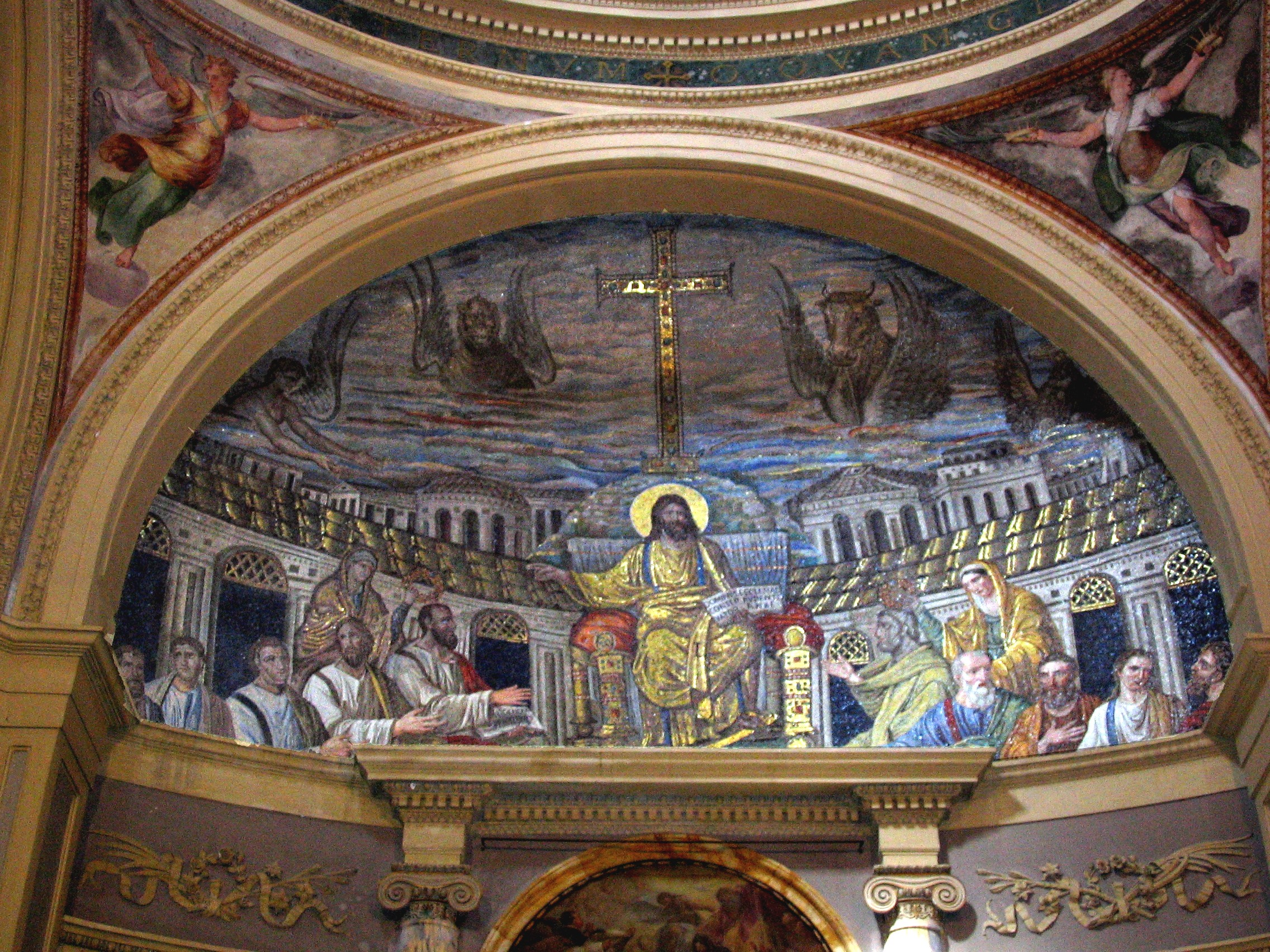
Late Roman mosaics in Santa Pudenziana, Rome.

Mosaic is the art of decorating solid surfaces with pieces of multi-colored stone or glass set in mortar. Golden mosaic can be created by applying gold leaf to a single surface of a transparent glass tile, and placing the gilt inwards towards the mortar so that it is visible but cannot be scraped. The gilt tiles are often used as a background to figures, giving a glowing and sumptuous effect. Mosaic can be applied equally well to flat or curved surfaces and is often used to decorate vaults and domes. In churches where mosaic is applied extensively, it gives an impression that the interior of the church has been spread with a blanket of pictures and patterns.

Mosaic was a common form of decoration throughout the Roman Empire and because of its durability was usually applied to floors, where it was at first executed in pebbles or small marble tiles. During the Early Christian period glass tiles were used extensively for wall and vault decorations, the vault of the Mausoleum of Santa Costanza in Rome being a fine example of decorative, non-narrative Christian mosaic. A perhaps unique example of Late Roman pictorial mosaic is the magnificent apsidal mosaic of the Church of Santa Pudenziana. The nearby church, dedicated to her sister Santa Prassede, has mosaics which are Byzantine in style.

Mosaic was a favorite form of decoration in the Byzantine period and richly decorated churches in this style can be seen throughout Greece, in Turkey, Italy, Sicily, Russia and other countries. In the 19th century, gold mosaics were applied to the domes of the chancel of St Paul's Cathedral in London, illustrating the creation. In Western Europe, however, it was rare north of the Alps.

=== Stone ===
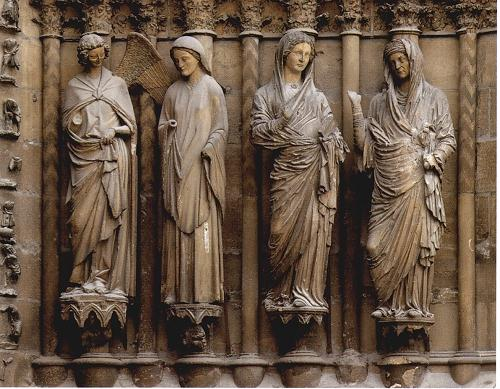
Annunciation and Visitation in Reims Cathedral.

Sculpture in stone is seemingly the most permanent way of creating images. Because stone is durable to the weather, it is the favored way of adding figurative decoration to the exteriors of church buildings, either with free-standing statues, figures that form a structural part of the building, or panels of pictorial reliefs. Unfortunately with the pollution and acid rain of the 19th and 20th centuries, much architectural sculpture that had remained reasonably intact for centuries has rapidly deteriorated and become unrecognizable in the last 150 years. On the other hand, much sculpture that is located within church buildings is as fresh as the day it was carved. Because it is often made of the very substance of the building which houses it, narrative stone sculpture is often found internally to be decorating features such as capitals, or as figures located within the apertures of stone screens.

The first Christian sculpture took the form of sarcophagi, or stone coffins, modelled on those of non-Christian Romans which were often pictorially decorated. Hence, on Christian sarcophagi there were often small narrative panels, or images of Christ enthroned and surrounded by Saints. In Byzantine Italy, the application of stone reliefs of this nature spread to cathedra (bishop's thrones), ambo (reading lecterns), well heads, baldachin (canopy over altar) and other objects within the church, where it often took on symbolic form such as paired doves drinking from a chalice. Capitals of columns tended to be decorative, rather than narrative. It was in Western Europe, Northern France in particular, that sculptural narrative reached great heights in the Romanesque and Gothic periods, decorating, in particular, the great West Fronts of the cathedrals, the style spreading from there to other countries of Europe. In England, figurative architectural decoration most frequently was located in vast screens of niches across the West Front. Unfortunately, like the frescoes and windows, they were decimated in the Reformation.

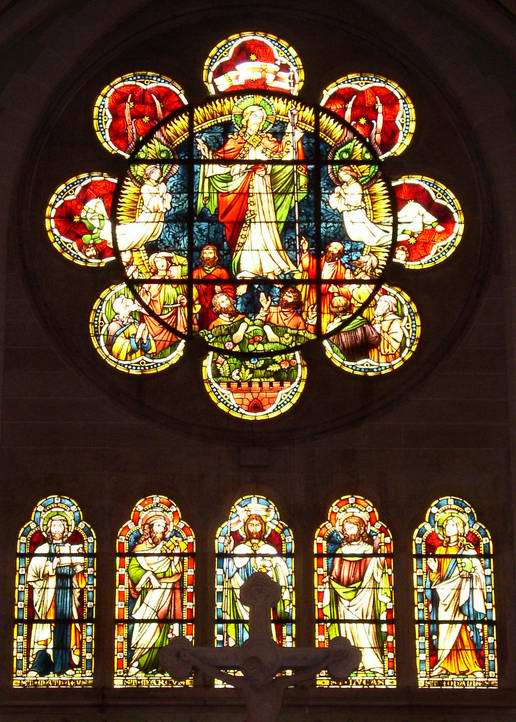
Stained glass Ascension, Himmelfahrtskirche, Dresden-Leuben, 1901.

=== Stained glass ===
Stained glass windows are created by cutting pieces of colored glass to match a drawn template and setting them into place in a mesh of lead cames and supporting the whole with rigid metal bars. Details such as facial features can be painted on the surface of the glass, and stains of bright yellow applied to enliven white areas. The effect is to add an appearance of brilliance and richness to a church interior, while the media lends itself to narratives. If the lead is properly maintained, stained glass is extremely durable and many windows have been in place for centuries.

In Italy, during the Byzantine period, windows were often filled with thin slices of alabaster, which although not figurative, gave a brightly patterned effect when sunlight was transmitted through them. There is a rare example of alabaster being used for a figurative subject in the Dove of the Holy Spirit, in the chancel of St Peter's in Rome. The earliest known figurative stained glass panel is a small head of Christ (with many fragments missing) found in a ditch near the royal abbey of Lorsch-an-der-Bergstrasse and thought to date from the 9th century. Although a few panels dating from the 10th and 11th centuries exist in museums, the earliest known that are in situ are four panels of King David and three prophets at Augsburg Cathedral in Germany dating from about 1100. Stained Glass windows were a major art form in the cathedrals and churches of France, Spain, England and Germany. Although not as numerous, there are also some fine windows in Italy, notably the rose window by Duccio in Siena Cathedral and those at the base of the dome in Florence Cathedral, which were designed by the most famous Florentine artists of the early 15th century including Donatello, Paolo Uccello and Lorenzo Ghiberti. With the Gothic Revival of the 19th century, stained glass returned as a major Christian art form in churches across the world.

=== Panel painting ===
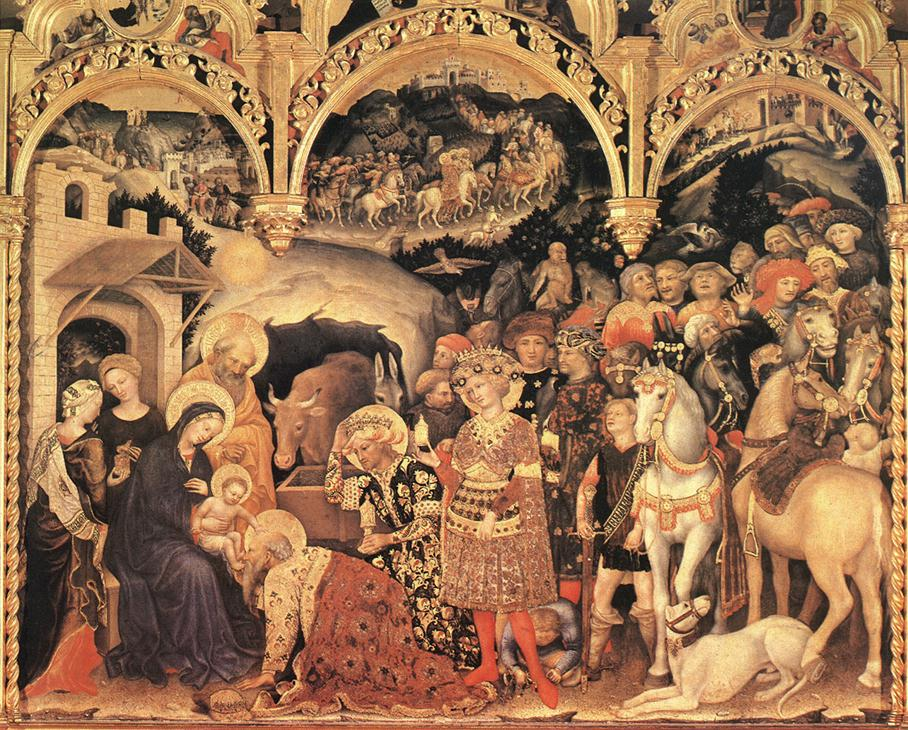
Adoration of the Magi by Gentile da Fabriano (1423), Florence, Uffizi Gallery.

Panel paintings are those done on specially prepared wooden surfaces. Before the technique of oil painting was introduced by the Dutch masters of the 15th century, panel paintings was done using tempera, in which powdered color was mixed with egg yolk. It was applied on a white ground, the colors being built up in layers, with tiny brushstrokes, the details often finished with gold leaf. With the invention of oil painting and its introduction to Italy and other countries of Europe, it became easier to create large works of art.

In the 1st century a similar technique was employed in Egypt to paint funerary portraits. Many of these remain in excellent condition. Tempera panels were a common art form in the Byzantine world and are the preferred method for creating icons. Because the method was very meticulous, tempera paintings are often small, and were frequently grouped into a single unit with hinged sections, known as a diptych, triptych or polyptych, depending on its number of parts. Some large altarpiece paintings exist, particularly in Italy where, in the 13th century, Duccio di Buoninsegna, Cimabue and Giotto created the three magnificent Madonnas that now hang in the Uffizi Gallery, but were once housed in the churches of Florence. With the development of oil painting, oil on panel began to replace tempera as a favored method of enhancing a church. The oil paint lent itself to a richer and deeper quality of color than tempera, and permitted the painting of textures in ways that were highly realistic.

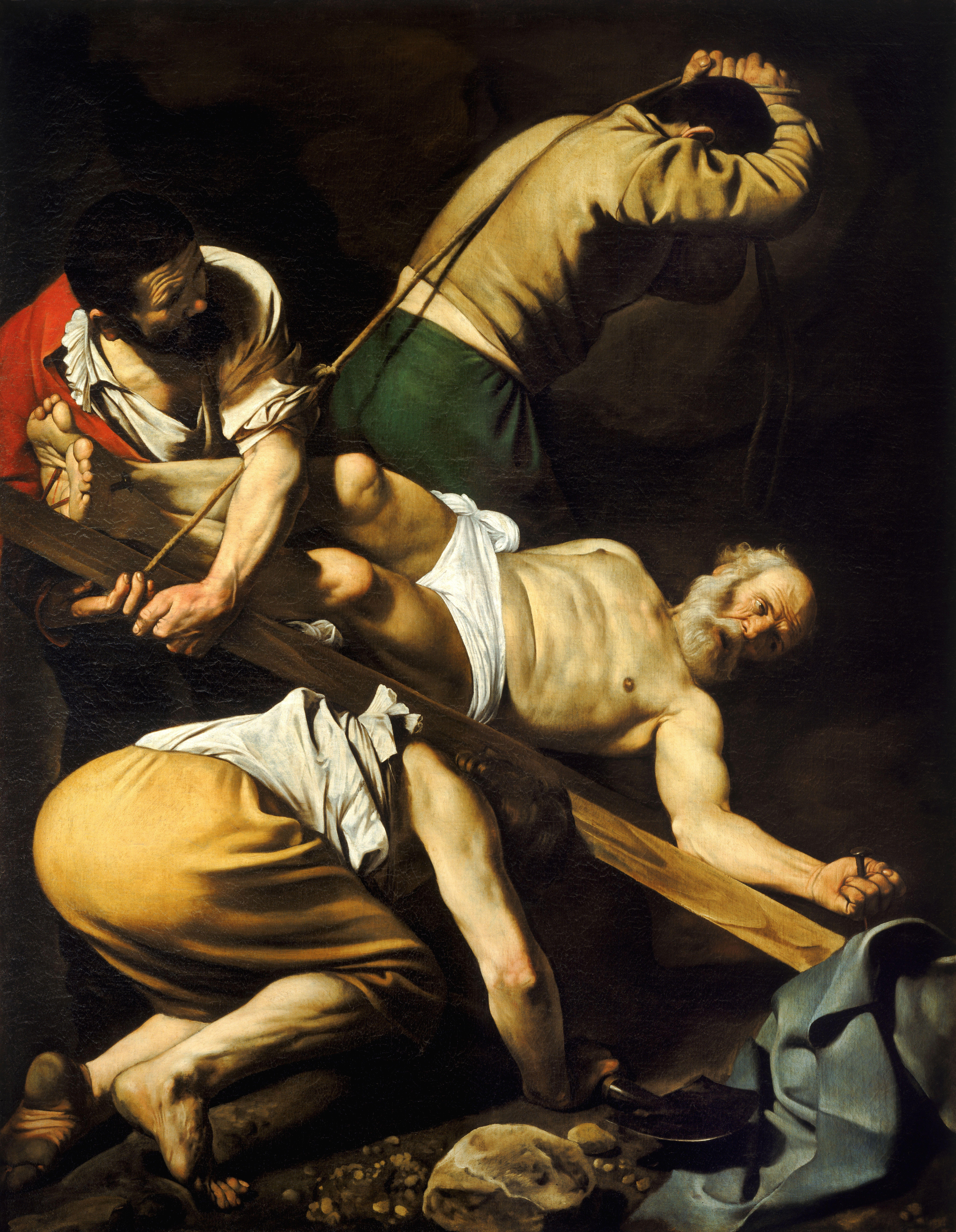
Crucifixion of St. Peter, Caravaggio, 1601, Santa Maria del Popolo, Rome

=== Oil on canvas ===
Oil paint comprises ground pigment mixed with linseed and perhaps other oils. It is a medium which takes a long time to dry, and lends itself to varied methods and styles of application. It can be used on a rigid wooden panel, but because it remains flexible, it can also be applied to a base of canvas made from densely woven linen flax, hence, the linseed oil and the canvas base are both products of the same plant which is harvested in Northern Europe. With canvas spread over a wooden frame as a base, paintings can be made very large and still light in weight, and relatively transportable though liable to damage. In the latter 15th century, oil paintings were generally done in a meticulous manner that simulated the smoothness and luminescent layering of tempera. In the 16th century the handling of the paint became freer and painters exploited the possibility of laying paint on in broad, visible and varied brushstrokes.

Oil paintings initially became a popular method for producing altarpieces and soon replaced tempera for this purpose. The ease with which large paintings could be created meant that not only did very large altar paintings proliferate, taking the place of polyptychs made of small panels, but because they were of relatively light weight, such pictures could be used on ceilings, by setting them into wooden frames and without the trouble of the artist having to work laboriously on a scaffold. Famous Venetian painters, Titian, Tintoretto and Veronese produced many such pictures. Peter Paul Rubens painted a Passion of Christ in a number of large canvases.

=== Wood ===
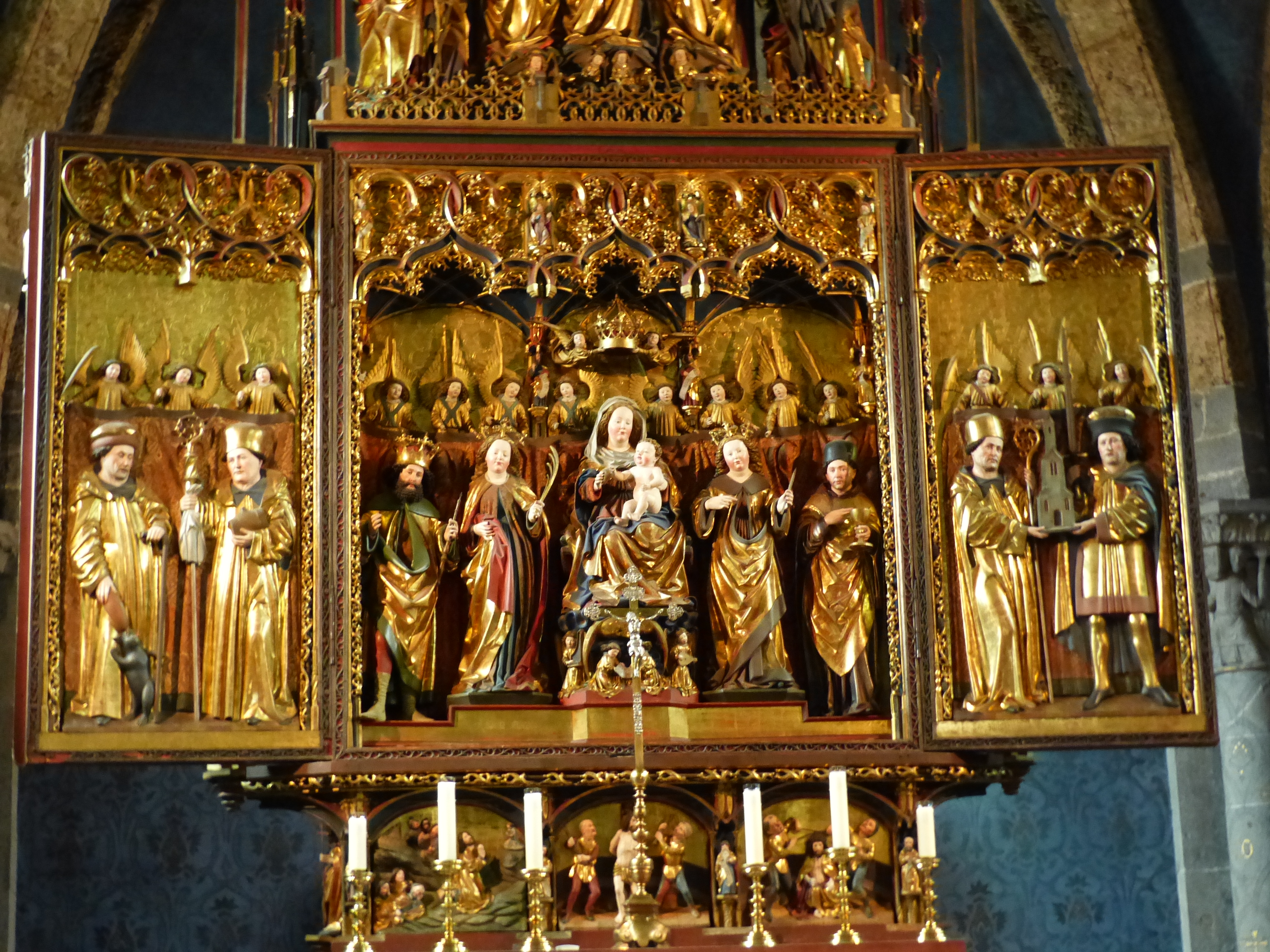
Altarpiece from Chur, Switzerland.

Because the nature of wood lends itself to easy working it has been a favored material for decorative fittings within churches. It can be carved, veneered and inlaid with other materials. It can be lacquered, painted or gilt. It can be used for artefacts and free-standing sculptures. It is relatively robust unless finely carved, but must be protected from mold and insects.

In the Byzantine period ivory rather than wood was the preferred material for carving into small religious objects, caskets, panels and furniture, the throne of Maximianus of Ravenna, with carved reliefs of Biblical stories and saints, being the finest example. The oldest large wooden sculpture to have survived in Europe is the painted and gilt oak Crucifix of Archbishop Gero (969-971), in Cologne Cathedral. Subsequent to this time, there are an increasing number of surviving large Crucifixes and free-standing statues, large and small, often of the Virgin and Child. Much of the wooden furniture in churches is richly decorated with carved figures, as are structural parts such as roof bosses and beams. Carved and decorated wooden screens and reredos remain from the 13th century onwards. In Germany, in particular, the skill of making carved altarpieces reached a high level in the Late Gothic/Early Renaissance. In Belgium wood carving reached a height in the Baroque period, when the great pulpits were carved.

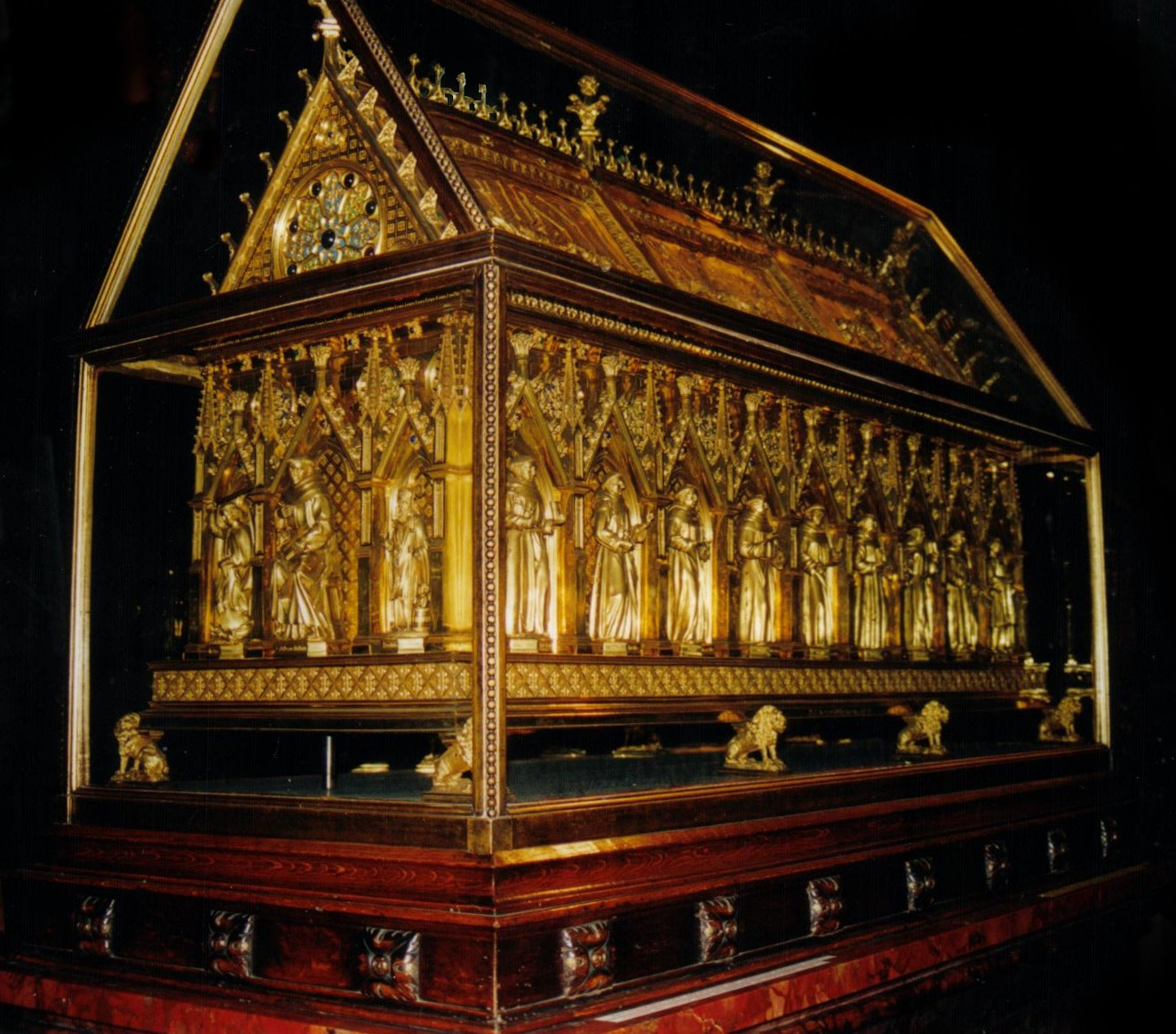
Reliquary of the Twenty Martyrs, Flemish, Gothic

=== Metal ===
Christian metalwork can take a vast number of forms, from a tiny Crucifix to a large statue or elaborate tomb or screen. The metals used can range from the finest gold leaf or silver filigree to cast bronze and wrought iron. Metal was commonly used for Communion vessels, for candelabra and all types of small fittings, and lent itself to being richly decorated by a number of techniques. It can be molded, hammered, twisted, engraved, inlaid and gilded. If properly maintained, metal is extremely durable. Most metal articles appearing to be gold are Silver-gilt or gilt bronze.

From the early Byzantine period there remains a number of Communion vessels, some of which, like the paten found at Antioch, have repousse decoration of religious subjects. From the 8th century come Byzantine crucifixes and the famous Ardagh Chalice from Ireland, decorated with cloisonne. From the Romanesque period onwards are the golden Altar frontal of Basel Cathedral (1022), Bonanno Pisano's bronze doors at Monreale Cathedral (1185), the font of St Michael's, Hildesheim (1240) and reliquaries, altar frontals and other such objects. In the early 15th century the renowned sculptor, Donatello was commissioned to create series of figures for the chancel screen of the Basilica di Sant'Antonio in Padua.

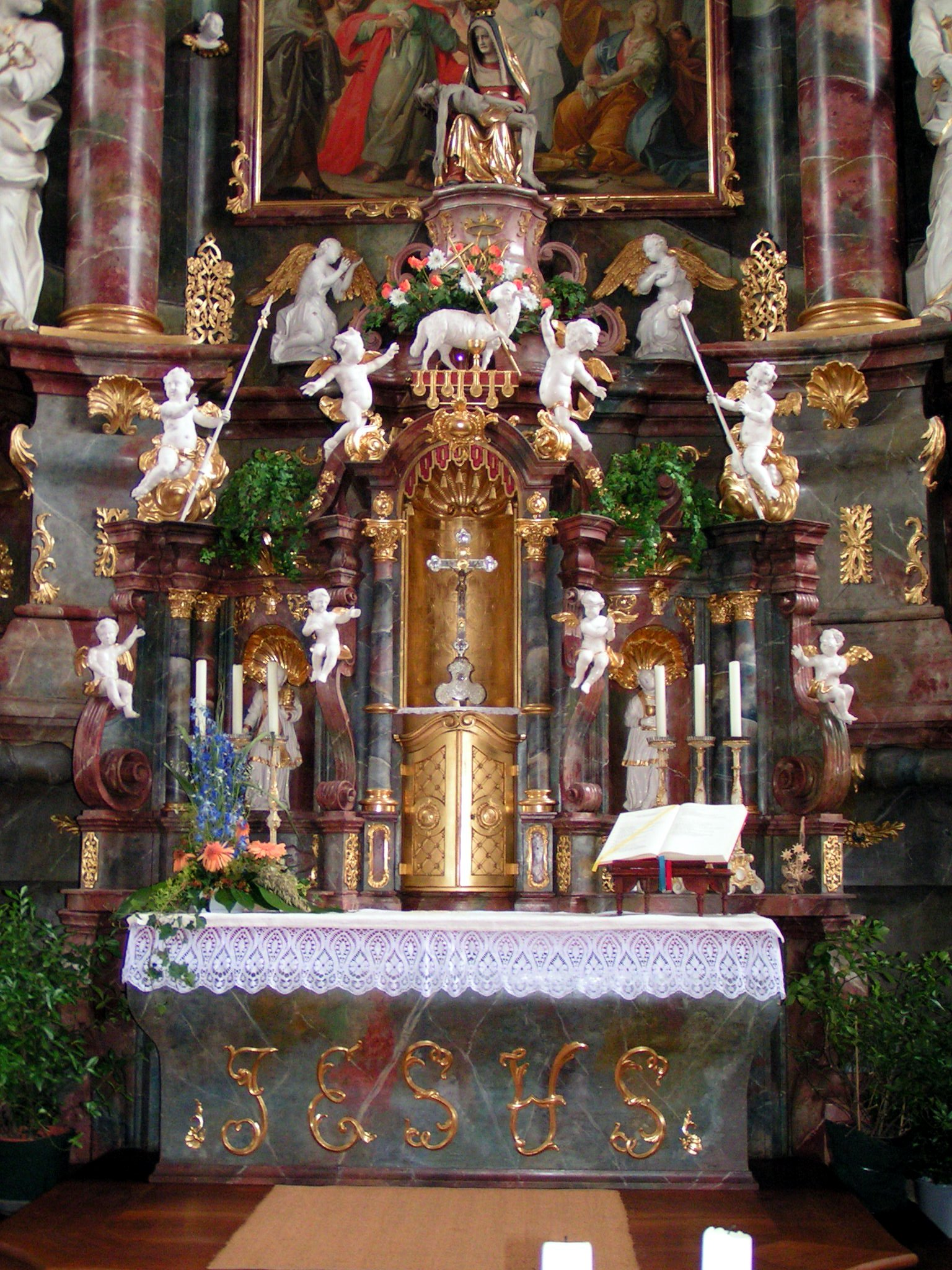
Altar of the Sacrament, Wallfahrtskirche, Steinhausen.

=== Mixed ===
It is normal for many objects to combine several media. Oil paintings, for example, usually come in ornate frames of gilt wood. Among the most sumptuous and decorative objects that are to be found within churches are those constructed of mixed media, in which any of the above may be combined.

St. Mark's Basilica of Venice houses the Pala d'Oro, an altarpiece pieced together over several hundred years so that it has elements of the Gothic and the Byzantine arts. The Pala d'Oro is made of gold and is set with enamels, jewels, semi-precious stones and pearls. Hardstone carvings and engraved gems, often from antiquity were highly valued, and given elaborate mounts in goldsmith work. In the Baroque period the use of mixed media reached a high point as great altarpieces were constructed out of pietra dura and marble, wood and metal, often containing oil paintings as well. Some of these altarpieces create illusionistic effects, as if the viewer were having a vision. Other objects that are commonly of mixed media are devotional statues, particularly of the Blessed Virgin Mary, which most commonly have faces of painted plaster, but also of wax, ivory, porcelain and terracotta. They are often dressed in elaborate satin garments decorated with metallic braid and lace, pearls, beads and occasionally jewels and may be decked with jewelry and trinkets offered by the faithful.

Another mixed-media art form is the tableau, which may comprise a Gethsemane or a Christmas Creche. These may be elaborate and exquisite, or may be assembled by the Sunday School using cotton-reels bodies, ping-pong ball heads and bottle-top crowns.

== Examples ==
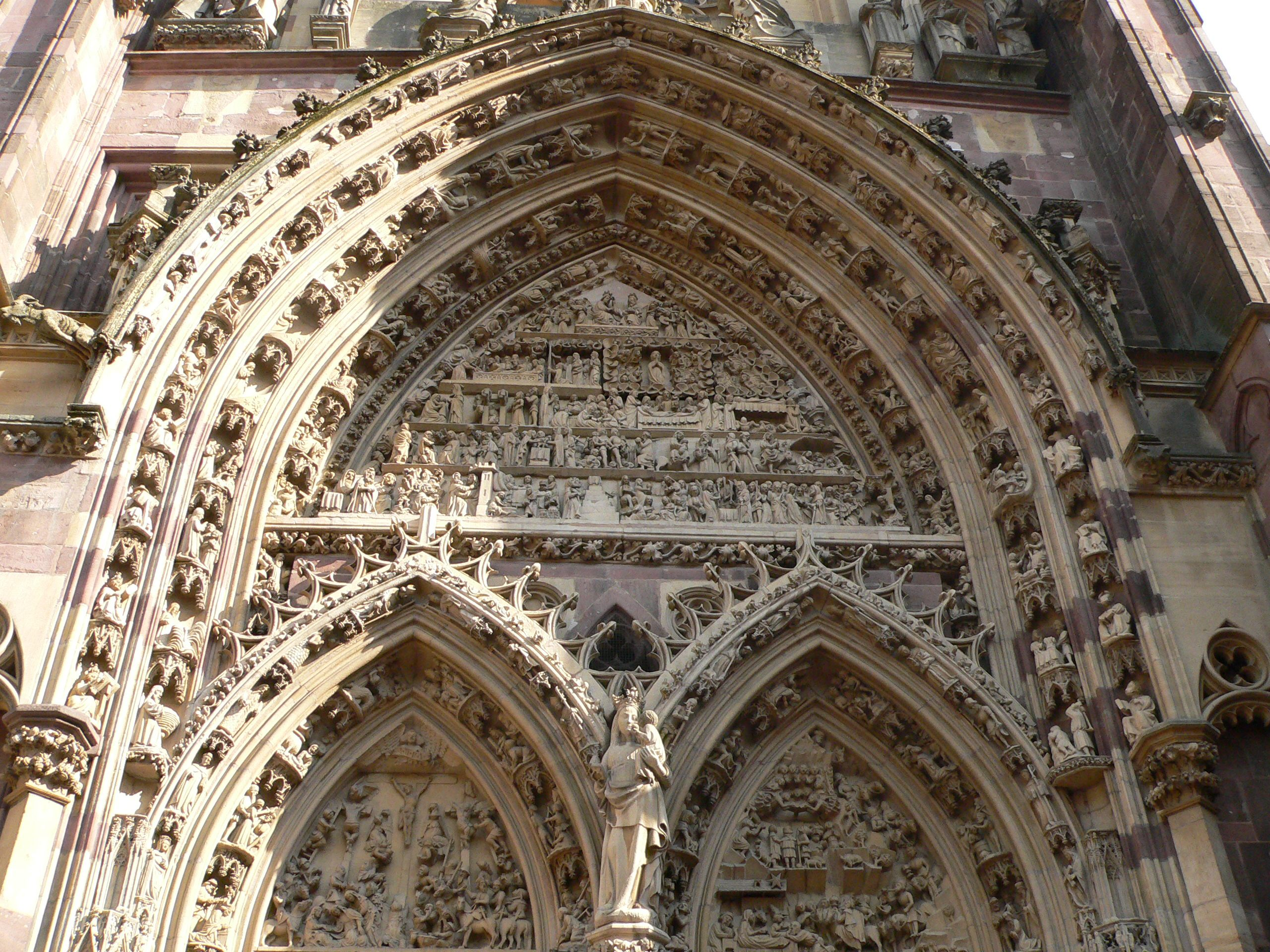
Saint-Thiébaut church in Thann, Haut-Rhin (Gothic, 14th century). The tympana of the main portal.

- The decoration of the Baptistery of Padua, a small cubic domed church which stands next to the city's cathedral, executed by Giusto de' Menabuoi, comprises one of the most complete and comprehensive frescoed Poor Man's Bibles (1376–78).
- The Collegiate church of San Gimignano contains a remarkably intact and consistent scheme by a number of different painters, comprising a Last Judgement, an Old Testament narrative including the Story of Job and the Life of Christ, as well as several other frescoes and artworks.
- The mosaic scheme of St Mark's Basilica in Venice covers the portals, porches, walls, vaults, domes and floors. There are also a Rood Screen and the Pala d'Oro, as well as reliquaries of every imaginable description.
- Chartres Cathedral contains an incomparable range of stained glass, including some of the earliest in situ in the world. It also has three richly carved Gothic portals of which the stylized 12th-century figures of the western Royal Portal are the earliest.
- The western façade of Thann, Haut-Rhin's Collegiate church of Saint-Thiébaut, features a particularly vast and ornate portal, whose multiple tympana, archivolts and surrounding statues depict 150 scenes from the Old and the New Testament with over 500 different figures.
- Canterbury Cathedral contains a greater number of early Gothic windows than any other English Cathedral. While the 19th century saw the removal of some of the glass to museums and private collections, with reproductions put in their place, much still remains, including the fragmentary Poor Man's Bible window (reproduced above).
- Isenheim Altarpiece by Matthias Grünewald (1506–1515) shows scenes of the birth, crucifixion and glory of Christ. The sick would be placed to sleep in front of the image of the crucified Christ, in the hope of healing. Different aspects of the altarpiece would be revealed in different seasons of the year. The church in which it is housed is now open as a museum.
- The Cathedral of Ghent contains the Ghent Altarpiece by Hubert and Jan van Eyck (1432). It is a Poor Man's Bible within itself, the various scenes representing the Fall of Man and the Salvation, with the Mystic Lamb of God and the enthroned Christ at its center.
- The church of San Zaccaria in Venice contains a series of huge oil paintings by many of Venice's best-known painters, illustrating the story of St Zachariah was the father of John the Baptist, as told in the Gospel of Luke. The church also houses Giovanni Bellini's altarpiece of the Madonna and Child surrounded by Saints
- The windows of St Andrew's in Sydney make up one of the earliest complete schemes of English 19th-century glass. It shows the Life of Jesus, the Miracles and the Parables. The set was completed and installed by Hardman of Birmingham for the consecration in 1868. A short walk away is St Mary's Catholic Cathedral with another cycle of Hardman windows dating from the 1880s to the 1930s.

== See also ==
- Architecture of cathedrals and great churches
- Architecture of the medieval cathedrals of England
- Bernini – Italian sculptor and architect (1598–1680)
- Fra Angelico – Early Italian Renaissance painter (c. 1395–1455)
- Gothic architecture – Architectural style of Medieval Europe
- Italian Renaissance painting – Art movement
- List of cathedrals
- List of regional characteristics of European cathedral architecture
- Manuscript culture – Culture depending on hand-written manuscripts
- Nativity of Jesus in art – Artistic depictions of the Nativity or birth of Jesus, celebrated at Christmas
- Romanesque architecture – Medieval European architectural style
- Rose window – Circular window found in Gothic churches
- Sacri Monti of Piedmont and Lombardy – Christian devotional places in northern Italy
